= South African type XS tender =

Steam locomotive introduced in 1911

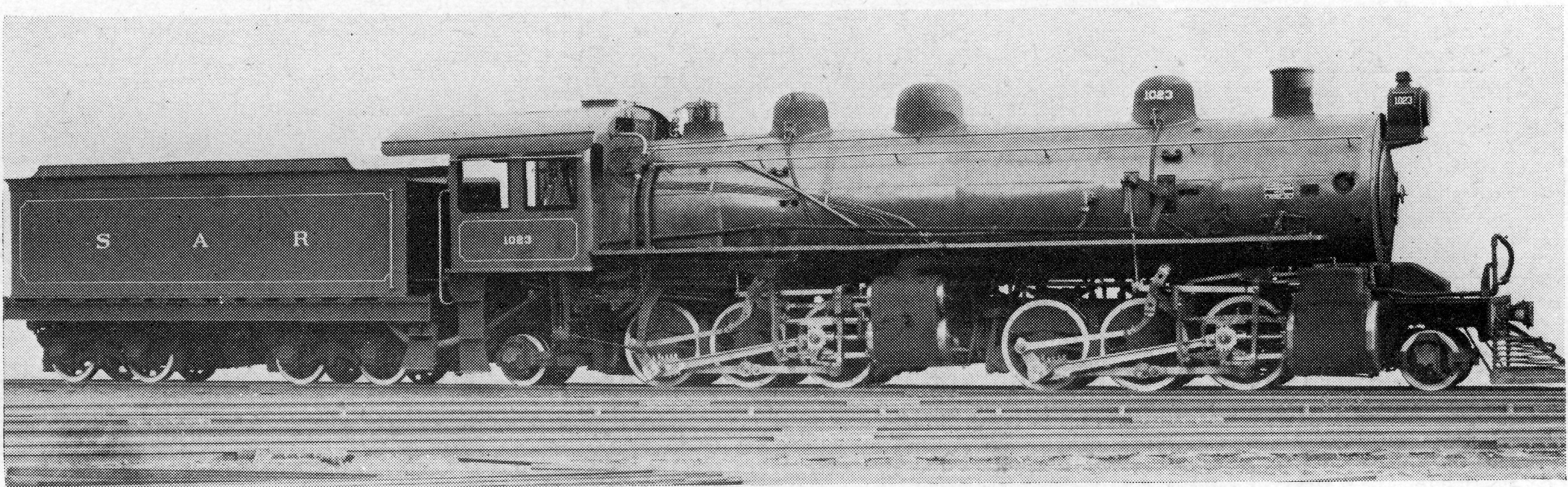
- Type XS tender on CSAR Superheated Mallet
Type and origin
- Locomotive: CSAR Superheated Mallet
- Designer: American Locomotive Company
- Builder: American Locomotive Company
- In service: 1911
Specifications
- Configuration: 2-axle bogies
- Gauge: 3 ft 6 in (1,067 mm) Cape gauge
- Length: 26 ft 1 1/4 in (7,957 mm)
- Wheel dia.: 34 in (864 mm)
- Wheelbase: 17 ft 11 in (5,461 mm)
  - Bogie: 4 ft 7 in (1,397 mm)
- Axle load: 13 LT 16 cwt (14,020 kg) average
  - Bogie: 27 LT 12 cwt (28,040 kg) each
- Weight empty: 51,248 lb (23,246 kg)
- Weight w/o: 55 LT 4 cwt (56,090 kg)
- Fuel type: Coal
- Fuel cap.: 10 LT (10.2 t)
- Water cap.: 5,000 imp gal (22,700 L)
- Stoking: Manual
- Couplers: Drawbar & Johnston link-and-pin
Career
- Operators: Central South African Railways; South African Railways
- Numbers: SAR 1619-1627

The South African type XS tender was a steam locomotive tender from the pre-Union era in Transvaal.

Type XS tenders entered service in 1911, as tenders to the 2-6-6-2 Superheated Mallet type steam locomotives which were acquired by the Central South African Railways in that year. These locomotives were designated Class MF on the South African Railways in 1912.

== Manufacturer ==
Type XS tenders were built in 1911 by the American Locomotive Company (ALCO).

In 1911, the Central South African Railways (CSAR) placed nine 2-6-6-2 Mallet articulated compound steam locomotives in service, built by ALCO. These locomotives were designated Class MF on the South African Railways (SAR) in 1912. The Type XS entered service as tenders to these engines.

== Characteristics ==
The tender had a coal capacity of 10 long tons (10.2 tonnes), a water capacity of 5,000 imperial gallons (22,700 litres) and an average maximum axle load of 13 long tons 16 hundredweight (14,020 kilograms).

== Locomotive ==
In the SAR years, tenders were numbered for the engines they were delivered with. In most cases, an oval number plate, bearing the engine number and often also the tender type, would be attached to the rear end of the tender. During the classification and renumbering of locomotives onto the SAR roster in 1912, no separate classification and renumbering list was published for tenders, which should have been renumbered according to the locomotive renumbering list.

Only the first batch of nine Class MF locomotives of 1911 were delivered new with Type XS tenders. In 1912, they were renumbered in the SAR number range from 1619 to 1627.

== Classification letters ==
Since many tender types are interchangeable between different locomotive classes and types, a tender classification system was adopted by the SAR. The first letter of the tender type indicates the classes of engines to which it could be coupled. The "X_" tenders could be used with the following locomotive classes:

- Cape Government Railways Mountain, SAR Class 4.
- SAR Class 4A.
- SAR Class 5.
- Cape Government Railways 6th Class of 1897, SAR Class 6B.
- Oranje-Vrijstaat Gouwerment-Spoorwegen 6th Class L3, SAR Class 6E.
- Cape Government Railways 6th Class of 1901 (Neilson, Reid), SAR Class 6H.
- Cape Government Railways 6th Class of 1902, SAR Class 6J.
- Cape Government Railways 8th Class of 1902, SAR Class 8.
- Imperial Military Railways 8th Class, SAR Class 8A.
- CSAR Class 8-L2, SAR Class 8B.
- CSAR Class 8-L3, SAR Class 8C.
- Cape Government Railways 8th Class 4-8-0 of 1903, SAR Class 8D.
- Cape Government Railways 8th Class Experimental, SAR Class 8E.
- Cape Government Railways 8th Class 4-8-0 of 1904, SAR Class 8F.
- Cape Government Railways 8th Class 2-8-0 of 1903, SAR Class 8Y.
- Cape Government Railways 8th Class 2-8-0 of 1904, SAR Class 8Z.
- CSAR Class 9, SAR Class 9.
- CSAR Class 10, SAR Class 10.
- CSAR Class 10-2 Saturated, SAR Class 10A.
- CSAR Class 10-2 Superheated. SAR Class 10B.
- CSAR Class 10-C, SAR Class 10C.
- CSAR Class 11, SAR Class 11.
- Cape Government Railways 9th Class of 1903, SAR Class Experimental 4.
- Cape Government Railways 9th Class of 1906, SAR Class Experimental 5.
- Cape Government Railways 10th Class, SAR Class Experimental 6.
- SAR Class ME.
- CSAR Mallet Superheated, SAR Class MF.

The second letter indicates the tender's water capacity. The "_S" tenders had a capacity of 5,000 imperial gallons (22,700 litres; 6,000 US gallons).
