= South African Class 5 4-6-2 =

1912 design of steam locomotive

South African Class 5 & 5R 4-6-2
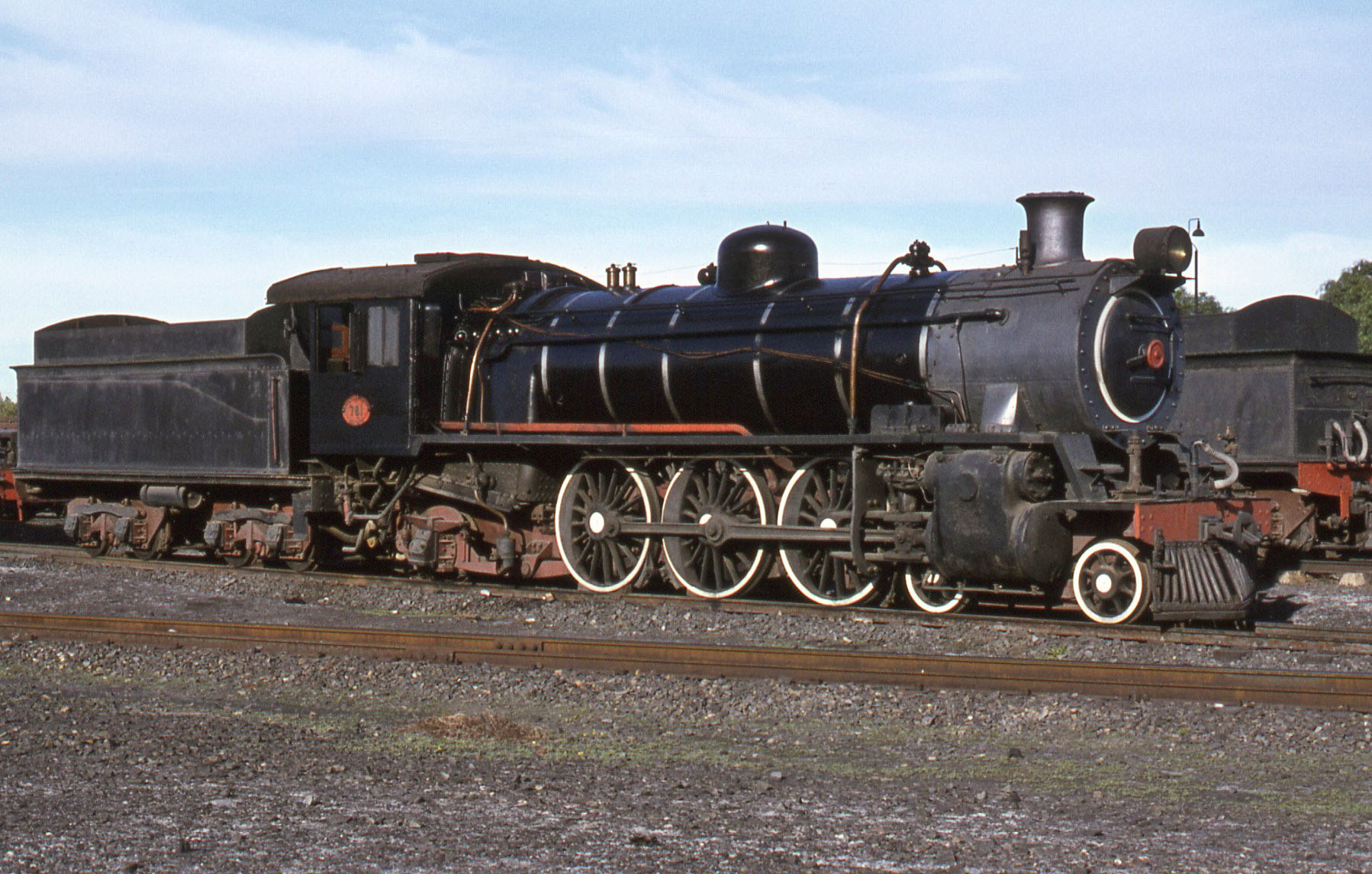
- Class 5R no. 781 retired at De Aar, 15 April 1978
Type and origin
- ♠ Class 5 as built with a Belpaire firebox ♥ Class 5R rebuilt with a Watson Standard boiler
- Power type: Steam
- Designer: Cape Government Railways (H.M. Beatty)
- Builder: Vulcan Foundry
- Serial number: 2774–2777
- Model: CGR Karoo Class
- Build date: 1912
- Total produced: 4
Specifications
- Configuration
  - Whyte: 4-6-2 (Pacific)
  - UIC: ♠ 2'C1'n2 – ♥ 2'C1'h2
- Driver: 2nd coupled axle
- Gauge: 3 ft 6 in (1,067 mm) Cape gauge
- Leading dia.: 30 1/2 in (775 mm)
- Coupled dia.: ♠ 61 in (1,549 mm) ♥ 62 in (1,575 mm)
- Trailing dia.: 34 in (864 mm)
- Tender wheels: 33 1/2 in (851 mm) as built 34 in (864 mm) retyred
- Wheelbase: 55 ft 10 1/4 in (17,024 mm)
  - Engine: 29 ft 5 in (8,966 mm)
  - Leading: 6 ft 2 in (1,880 mm)
  - Coupled: 10 ft 8 in (3,251 mm)
  - Tender: 16 ft 9 in (5,105 mm)
  - Tender bogie: 4 ft 7 in (1,397 mm)
- Length
  - Over couplers: ♠ 64 ft 1/2 in (19,520 mm) ♥ 64 ft 1 7/8 in (19,555 mm)
- Height: ♠ 12 ft 10 in (3,912 mm) ♥ 12 ft 11 in (3,937 mm)
- Frame type: Bar at front, Plate at rear
- Axle load: ♠ 15 LT 15 cwt (16,000 kg) ♥ 16 LT 9 cwt (16,710 kg)
  - Leading: ♠ 10 LT 10 cwt (10,670 kg) ♥ 15 LT 1 cwt (15,290 kg)
  - 1st coupled: ♠ 15 LT 10 cwt (15,750 kg) ♥ 15 LT 5 cwt (15,490 kg)
  - 2nd coupled: ♠ 15 LT (15,240 kg) ♥ 16 LT 9 cwt (16,710 kg)
  - 3rd coupled: ♠ 15 LT 15 cwt (16,000 kg) ♥ 15 LT 5 cwt (15,490 kg)
  - Trailing: ♠ 11 LT 10 cwt (11,680 kg) ♥ 10 LT (10,160 kg)
  - Tender bogie: Bogie 1: 24 LT 4 cwt (24,590 kg); Bogie 2: 25 LT 3 cwt (25,550 kg)
  - Tender axle: 12 LT 11 cwt 2 qtr (12,780 kg)
- Adhesive weight: ♠ 46 LT 5 cwt (46,990 kg) ♥ 46 LT 19 cwt (47,700 kg)
- Loco weight: ♠ 68 LT 5 cwt (69,350 kg) ♥ 72 LT 9 cwt (73,610 kg)
- Tender weight: 49 LT 7 cwt (50,140 kg)
- Total weight: ♠ 117 LT 12 cwt (119,500 kg) ♥ 121 LT 16 cwt (123,800 kg)
- Tender type: XM2 (2-axle bogies); XC, XC1, XD, XE, XE1, XF, XF1, XF2, XJ, XM, XM1, XM2, XM3, XM4, XP1, XS permitted
- Fuel type: Coal
- Fuel capacity: 10 LT (10.2 t)
- Water cap.: 4,000 imp gal (18,200 L)
- Firebox
  - Type: ♠ Belpaire ♥ Round-top
  - Grate area: ♠ 34.2 sq ft (3.18 m^{2}) ♥ 36 sq ft (3.3 m^{2})
- Boiler
  - Model: ♥ Watson Standard no. 1
  - Pitch: ♠ 7 ft 5 in (2,261 mm) ♥ 8 ft (2,438 mm)
  - Diameter: ♠♥ 5 ft (1,524 mm)
  - Tube plates: ♠ 17 ft 9 in (5,410 mm) ♥ 17 ft 8 5/8 in (5,401 mm)
  - Small tubes: ♠ 184: 2 1/4 in (57 mm) ♥ 76: 2 1/2 in (64 mm)
  - Large tubes: ♥ 24: 5 1/2 in (140 mm)
- Boiler pressure: ♠ 200 psi (1,379 kPa) ♥ 190 psi (1,310 kPa)
- Safety valve: ♠ Ramsbottom ♥ Pop
- Heating surface
  - Firebox: ♠ 142 sq ft (13.2 m^{2}) ♥ 123 sq ft (11.4 m^{2})
  - Tubes: ♠ 1,924 sq ft (178.7 m^{2}) ♥ 1,497 sq ft (139.1 m^{2})
  - Total surface: ♠ 2,066 sq ft (191.9 m^{2}) ♥ 1,620 sq ft (151 m^{2})
- Superheater
  - Heating area: ♥ 366 sq ft (34.0 m^{2})
- Cylinders: Two
- Cylinder size: ♠ 19 in (483 mm) bore ♥ 20 in (508 mm) bore ♠♥ 28 in (711 mm) stroke
- Valve gear: Stephenson
- Valve type: ♠ Richardson balanced slide ♥ Piston
- Couplers: Johnston link-and-pin
Performance figures
- Tractive effort: ♠ 24,860 lbf (110.6 kN) @ 75% ♥ 25,750 lbf (114.5 kN) @ 75%
Career
- Operators: South African Railways
- Class: Class 5 & 5R
- Number in class: 4
- Numbers: 780–783
- Nicknames: Karoo
- Delivered: 1912
- First run: 1912
- Withdrawn: 1969
- The 2nd coupled axle had flangeless wheels

The South African Railways Class 5 4-6-2 of 1912 was a steam locomotive.

In 1912, four Enlarged Karoo Class 4-6-2 Pacific type passenger steam locomotives which had been ordered by the Cape Government Railways the year before were placed in service by the newly established South African Railways. The locomotives were therefore numbered directly onto the South African Railways roster and designated Class 5.

== Manufacturer ==
The Cape Government Railways (CGR), Natal Government Railways (NGR) and Central South African Railways (CSAR) had all prepared designs and placed orders for new locomotives shortly prior to 1912, when the South African Railways (SAR) locomotive classification and renumbering scheme was implemented.

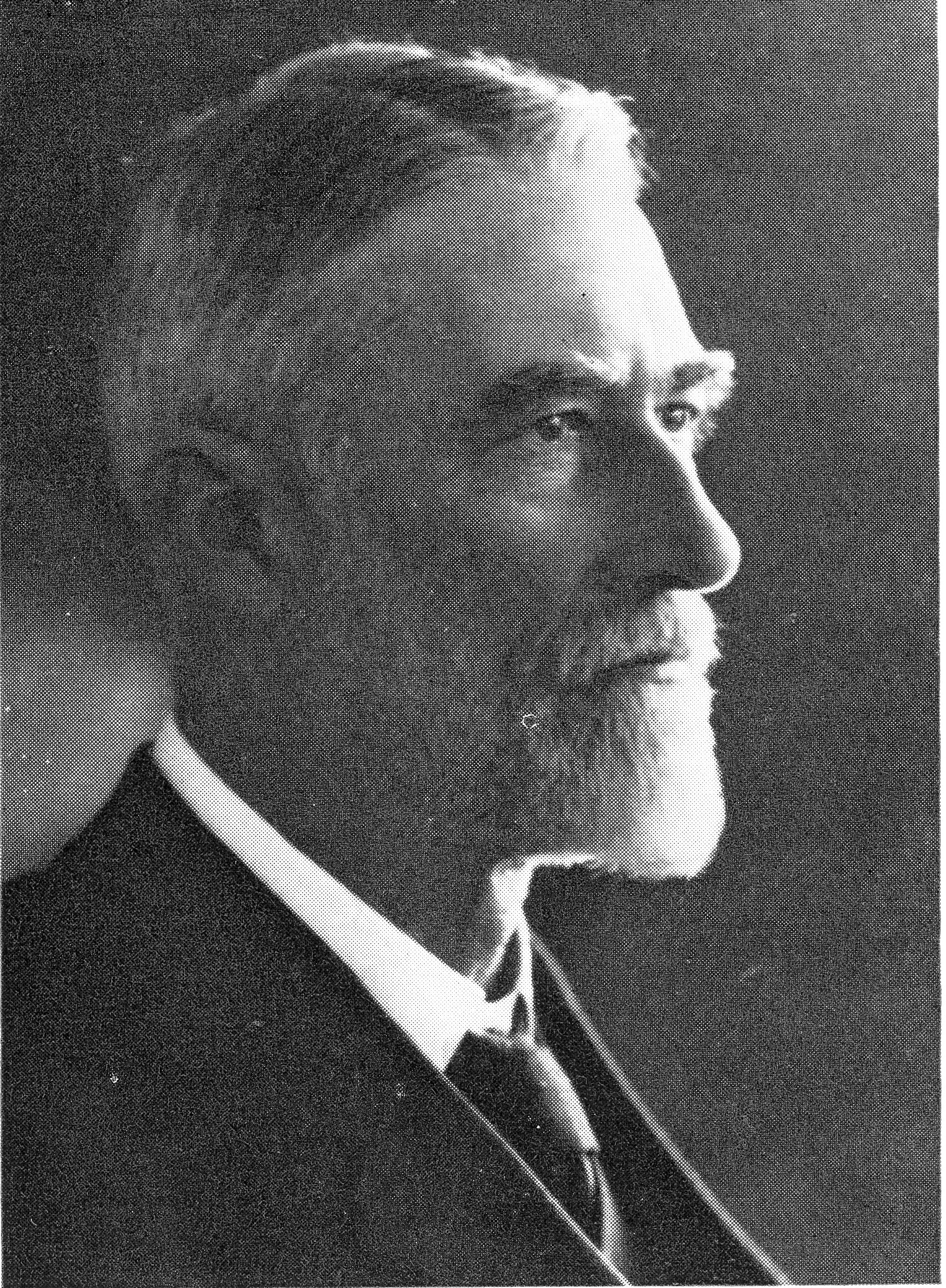
H.M. Beatty

The CGR's Enlarged Karoo, designed by H.M. Beatty, the Cape Government Railways Chief Locomotive Superintendent and built by Vulcan Foundry of Newton-le-Willows, was one of the locomotive types which were designed and ordered before the SAR was established and which ended up being delivered to the newly established national railways of the Union of South Africa. The locomotives were designated Class 5 and numbered in the range from 780 to 783. They entered service during November 1912.

== Characteristics ==
The Class 5 was a larger and heavier version of the Class 5B, with a higher pitched boiler, Belpaire firebox, larger diameter leading and coupled wheels and larger cylinders.

The cylinders were arranged outside the bar frames, with balanced Richardson type D slide valves arranged above the cylinders and actuated by Stephenson valve gear through rocker shafts. The hind frame of the engine was of the plate type and was widened out to receive the Belpaire firebox, which itself was a notable departure from the usual practice of the CGR to use round-topped fireboxes.

== Watson Standard boilers ==
In the 1930s, many serving locomotives were reboilered with a standard boiler type, designed by then Chief Mechanical Engineer A.G. Watson as part of his standardisation policy. Such Watson Standard reboilered locomotives were reclassified by adding an "R" suffix to their classification.

During 1935, only one of the Class 5 locomotives, no. 781, was reboilered with a Watson Standard no. 1 boiler and reclassified to Class 5R. The most obvious difference between the Class 5 and Class 5R is the absence of the Belpaire firebox hump between the cab and boiler on the reboilered locomotive.

During the reboilering process, the engine was also equipped with a superheater and underwent several other modifications. It was fitted with larger bore cylinders similar to those of the Class 15B, with piston valves and by-pass valves. The diameter of the coupled wheels was increased from 61 to 62 inches (1,549 to 1,575 millimetres).

The hind end of the frame was redesigned and the bridle casting was removed and replaced by a frame plate, riveted to the main bar frame and carried through to the hind buffer beam. A new steel casting, extending across and over the main frame, added rigidity and served as a support for the boiler at the throat plate. A new design of drag box was installed. While the trailing Bissel truck remained unaltered, its side control was re-designed and a new compensating beam and support pivot was fitted.

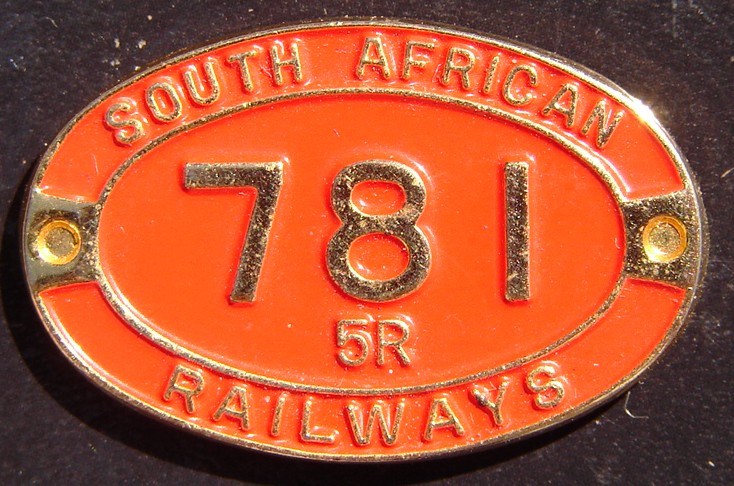

To compensate for the increased axle loads, the diameter of the driving axle was increased from 8 to 8 1/2 inches (203 to 216 millimetres), while that of the other two coupled wheel axles was increased from 7 1/2 to 8 inches (191 to 203 millimetres). Grease-lubricated axle boxes were fitted to all coupled wheels and new coupling and connecting rods of a heavier design were installed. All these alterations had the result that the boiler pitch was raised from 7 feet 5 inches (2,261 millimetres) to 8 feet (2,438 millimetres) and the weight of the engine was increased from 68 long tons 5 hundredweight (69,350 kilograms) to 72 long tons 9 hundredweight (73,610 kilograms). The overall length of the engine and tender was increased by 1 3/8 in (35 mm).

Their original boilers were fitted with Ramsbottom safety valves, while the Watson Standard boiler was fitted with Pop safety valves. Even though the boiler pressure setting of the reboilered engine was lowered from 200 to 190 pounds per square inch (1,379 to 1,310 kilopascals), the tractive effort increased from 24,860 to 25,750 pounds-force (111 to 115 kilonewtons) at 75% of boiler pressure.

== Service ==
The engines were placed in service on mainline passenger service between Cape Town and Touws River, where they remained until the loads became too heavy for them. From about 1928, they were used on secondary services, chiefly being employed to haul suburban passenger trains from Cape Town to the Strand and Stellenbosch.

The three Class 5 locomotives were withdrawn from service by 1942, but the sole Class 5R remained in service for another 27 years. For most of its working life, it was employed in suburban service in Cape Town, where it gained fame for the unusual achievement of being an individual locomotive which worked the same train, the Strand Express, for more than thirty years. It was only withdrawn occasionally for maintenance in the locomotive depot or for heavy repairs in the shops. During this time, it regularly attained a speed of 60 miles per hour (97 kilometres per hour) while en route between Cape Town and Bellville. It was sub-shedded at Sir Lowry's Pass and always had regular drivers.

When the Strand line was electrified in the mid-1960s, engine no. 781 was transferred to the Eastern Transvaal System for a short spell as a shunting engine at Nylstroom and in helper service between Naboomspruit and Nylstroom, before being transferred to Capital Park in Pretoria. Here it was at times used for menial tasks such as shed pilot to move engines around the Depot. From there, it was transferred to the Western Transvaal System and briefly stationed at Springs on the East Rand from where it worked the passenger service to Nigel. It spent its last years in service as station pilot at Germiston until it was withdrawn in 1969.

After withdrawal from service, it was returned to the Salt River Shops in Cape Town for use in the training of apprentice fitters, until it was moved to De Aar to be maintained for preservation.

== Preservation ==
Of the Class 5r, one survived into preservation. By 2019

| Number | Works nmr | THF / Private | Leaselend / Owner | Current Location | Outside SOUTH AFRICA | ? |
|---|---|---|---|---|---|---|
| 781 | | THF | Transnet Heritage Foundation | Bloemfontein Locomotive depot | | |

== Illustration ==
The main picture shows the retired Class 5R no. 781 at De Aar in 1978, while the following illustrate the differences in appearance due to modifications during the lifespan of the Class. The last picture of the reboilered no. 781 dates to the 1950s, by which time the original enormous headlight had been replaced.

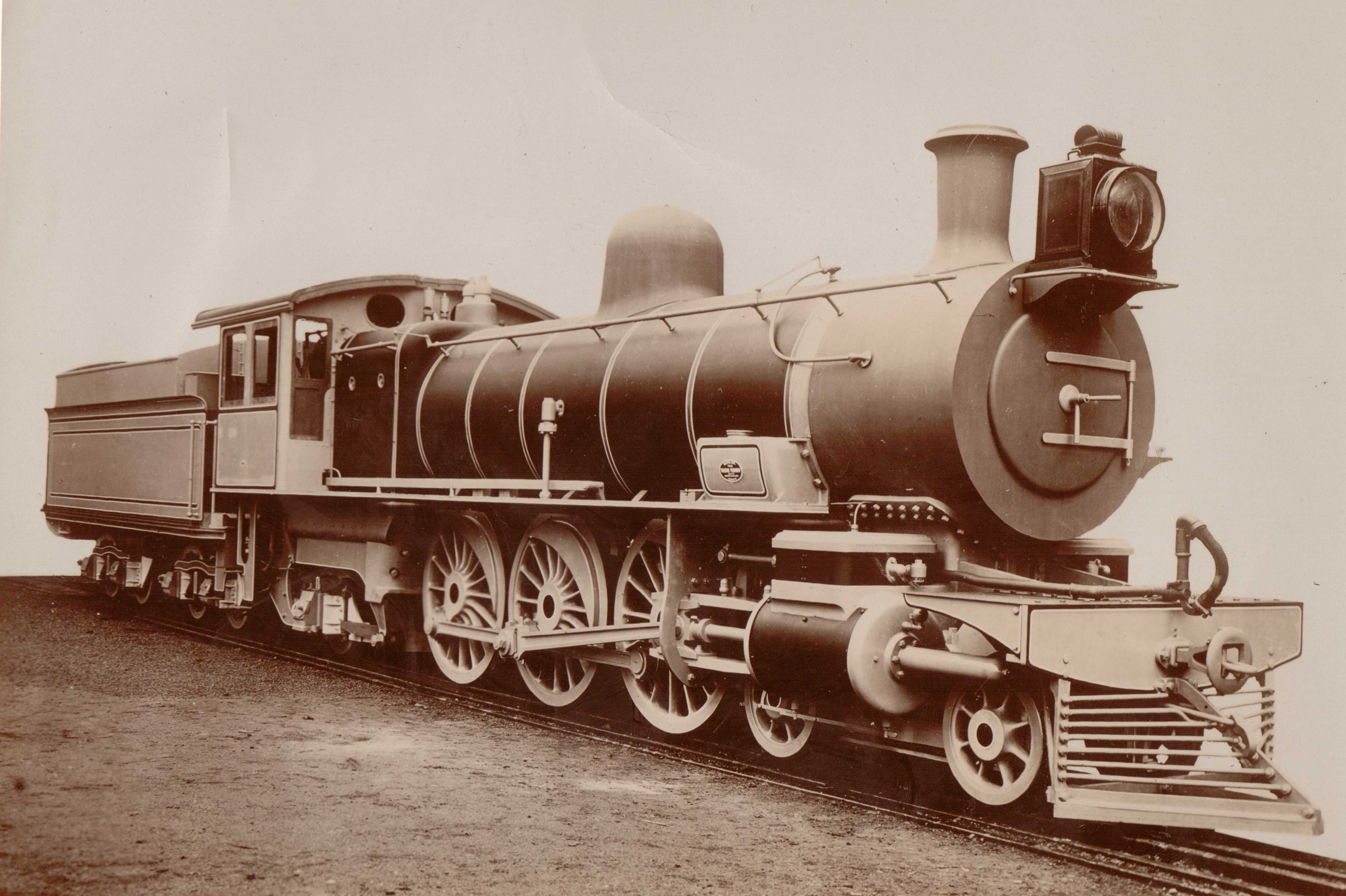
Vulcan Foundry works picture of no. 780

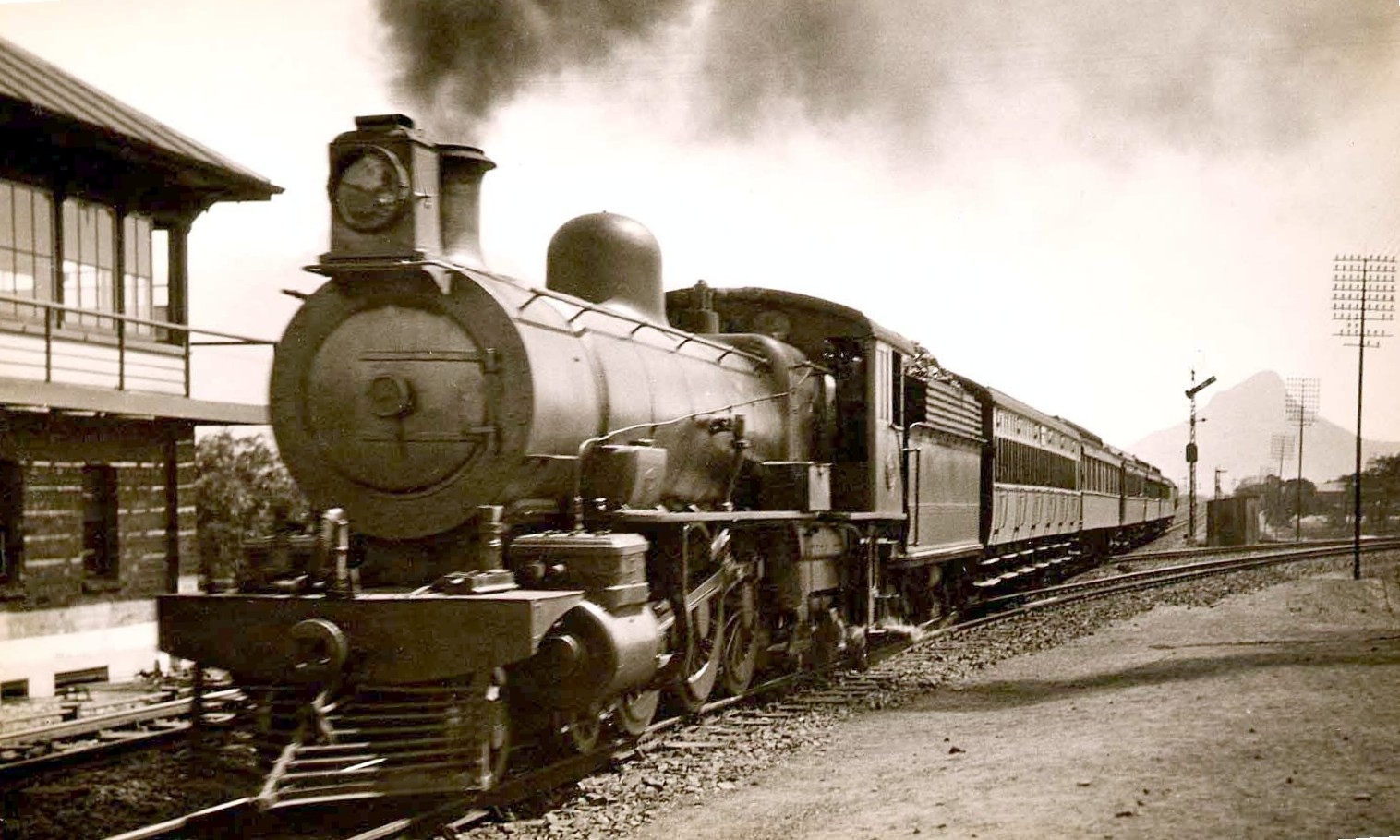
No. 783 passing the junction at Woltemade No. 3, c. 1930

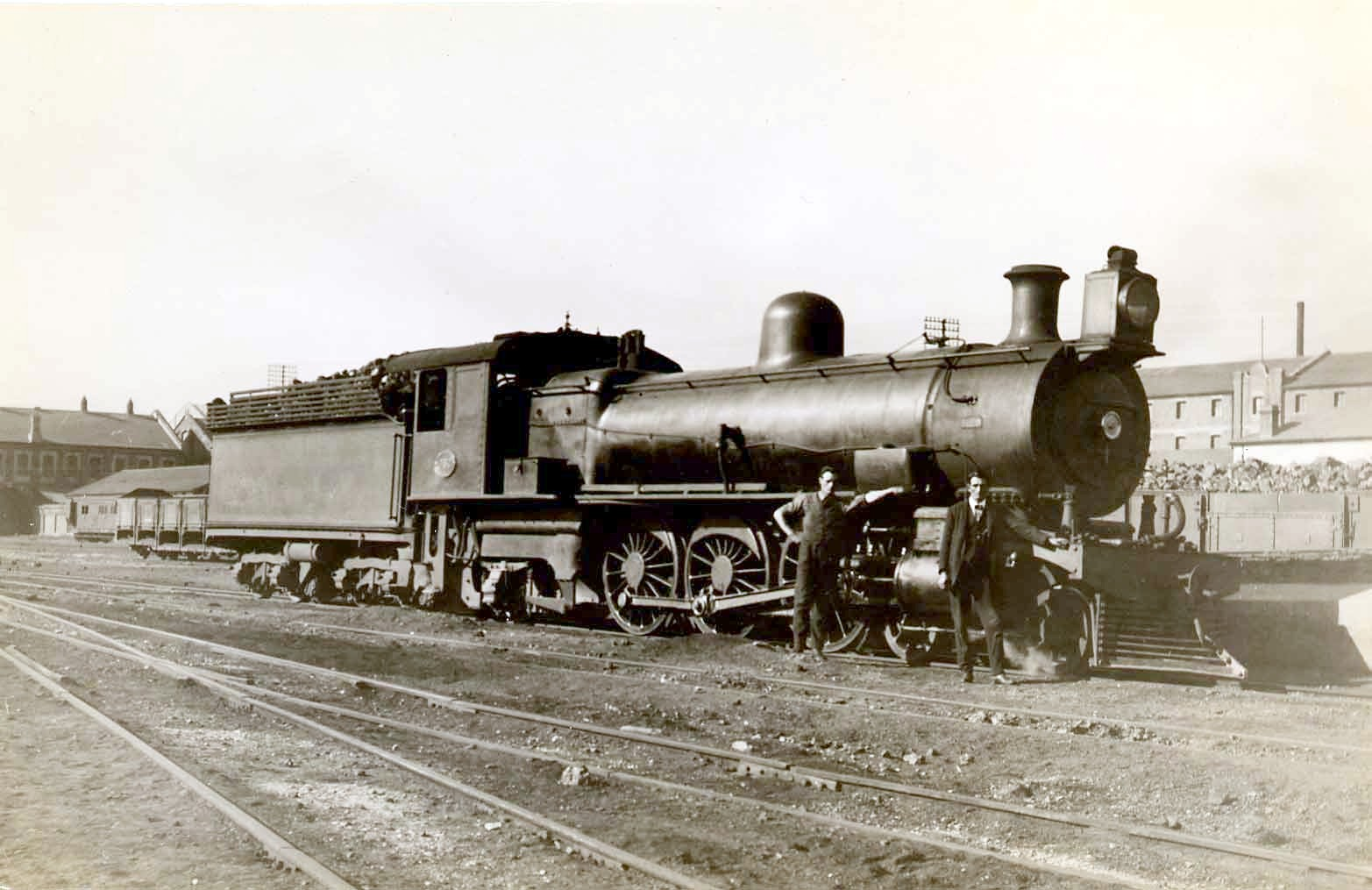
No. 782 with driver M. Mileham and stoker Treadaway, c.1930

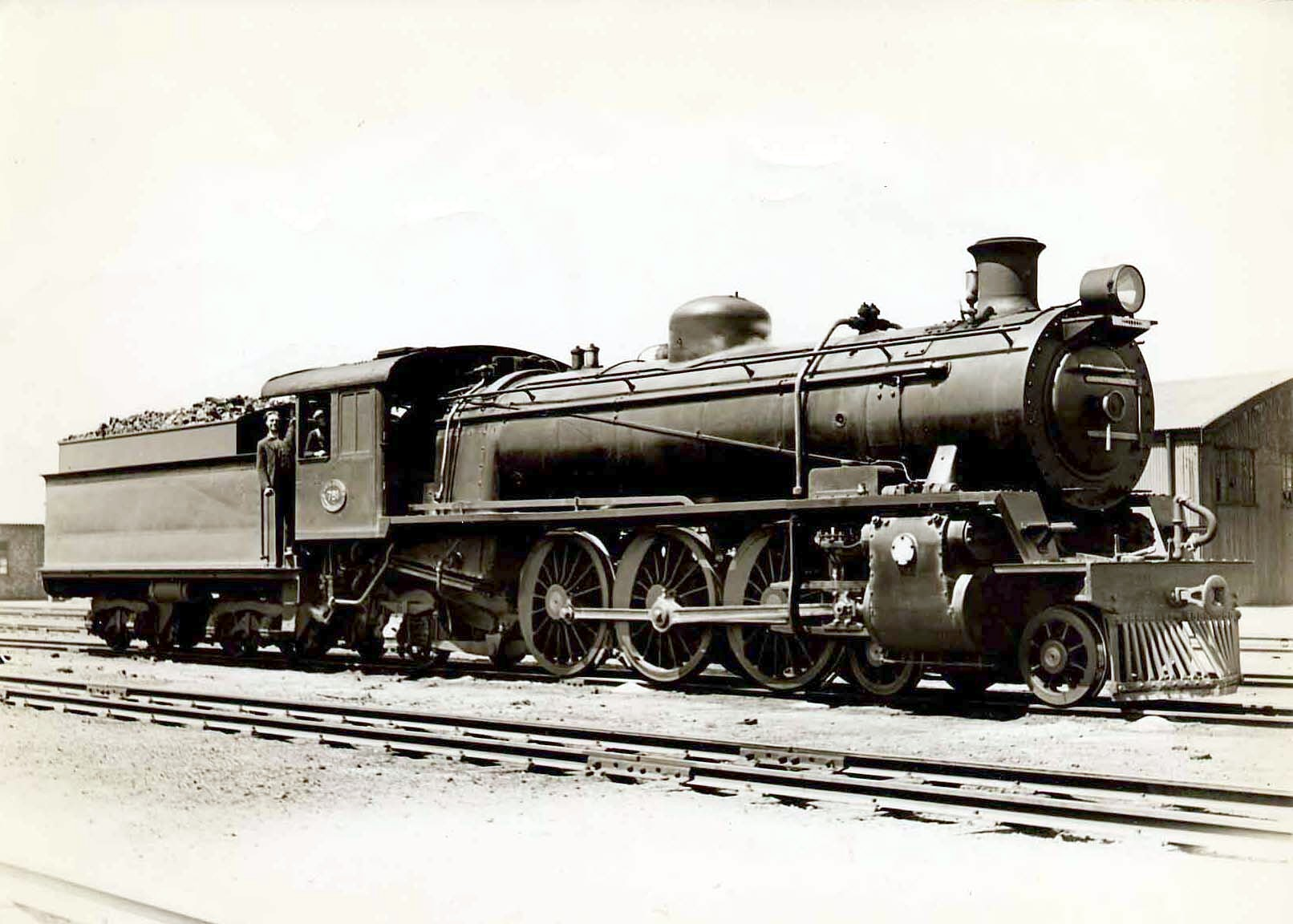
Class 5R no. 781 with driver Sonny Best, c.1950
