= South African type XE tender =

Steam locomotive tender in South Africa

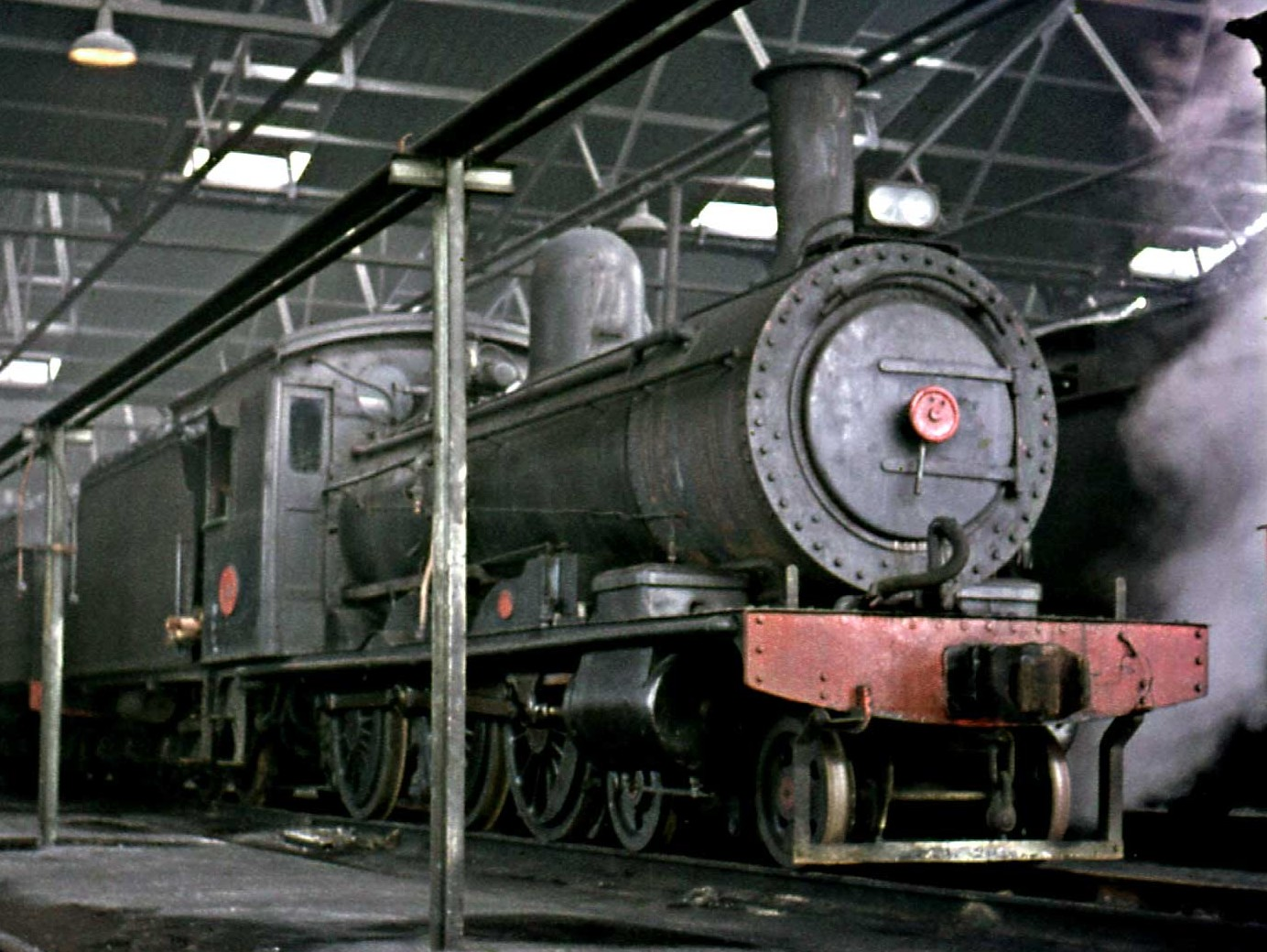
- Type XE tender on SAR Class 6B
Type and origin
- Locomotive: SAR Classes 6B & 6E
- Designer: South African Railways
- Builder: South African Railways
- In service: c. 1925
- Rebuilt from: Type XC1
Specifications
- Configuration: 2-axle bogies
- Gauge: 3 ft 6 in (1,067 mm) Cape gauge
- Length: 23 ft 9 1/8 in (7,242 mm)
- Wheel dia.: 34 in (864 mm)
- Wheelbase: 16 ft 1 in (4,902 mm)
  - Bogie: 4 ft 7 in (1,397 mm)
- Fuel type: Coal
- Fuel cap.: 8 LT (8.1 t)
- Water cap.: 2,850 imp gal (13,000 L)
- Stoking: Manual
- Couplers: Drawbar & Johnston link-and-pin Drawbar & AAR knuckle (1930s)
Career
- Operators: South African Railways
- Numbers: SAR 490-540, 598-603

The South African type XE tender was a steam locomotive tender.

Type XE tenders were rebuilt from Type XC1 tenders, which had entered service in 1897 and 1898. The rebuilding resulted in a tender with a larger water tank and larger coal bunker.

== Origin ==
The original Cape Government Railways (CGR) 6th Class locomotive and tender was designed at the Salt River works of the CGR in Cape Town in 1892, under the supervision of Western System Locomotive Superintendent H.M. Beatty. In 1897 and 1898, the CGR placed a third batch of 55 6th Class steam locomotives in service, which would be designated Class 6B on the South African Railways (SAR) in 1912.

The Type XC1 entered service as tenders to these locomotives. More entered service in 1898, as tenders to the Oranje-Vrijstaat Gouwerment-Spoorwegen (OVGS) 6th Class L3, Class 6E on the SAR. These two Classes were built by Dübs and Company, Neilson and Company, Neilson, Reid and Company and Sharp, Stewart and Company.

== Rebuilding ==
From c. 1925, several of the Type XC1 tenders were completely rebuilt by the SAR by mounting a new upper structure on the existing underframe, with larger water tanks and a larger coal capacity. These rebuilt tenders had a more modern appearance, with flush sides all the way to the top of the coal bunker. They were designated Type XE.

The program to rebuild several older tender types with new upper structures was begun by Col F.R. Collins DSO, who approved several of the detailed drawings for the work during his term in office as Chief Mechanical Engineer (CME) of the SAR from 1922 to 1929. It was continued by his successor, A.G. Watson.

== Characteristics ==
The rebuilt tender had a water capacity which had been increased from 2,600 to 2,850 imperial gallons (11,800 to 13,000 litres) and a coal capacity which had been increased from 5 long tons 10 hundredweight (5.6 tonnes) to 8 long tons (8.1 tonnes).

== Classification letters ==
Since many tender types are interchangeable between different locomotive classes and types, a tender classification system was adopted by the SAR. The first letter of the tender type indicates the classes of engines to which it can be coupled. The "X_" tenders could be used with the locomotive classes as shown.

- CGR Mountain, SAR Class 4.
- SAR Class 4A.
- SAR Class 5.
- CGR 6th Class of 1897, SAR Class 6B.
- OVGS 6th Class L3, SAR Class 6E.
- CGR 6th Class of 1901 (Neilson, Reid), SAR Class 6H.
- CGR 6th Class of 1902, SAR Class 6J.
- CGR 8th Class of 1902, SAR Class 8.
- Imperial Military Railways 8th Class, SAR Class 8A.
- Central South African Railways Class 8-L2, SAR Class 8B.
- Central South African Railways Class 8-L3, SAR Class 8C.
- CGR 8th Class 4-8-0 of 1903, SAR Class 8D.
- CGR 8th Class Experimental, SAR Class 8E.
- CGR 8th Class 4-8-0 of 1904, SAR Class 8F.
- CGR 8th Class 2-8-0 of 1903, SAR Class 8Y.
- CGR 8th Class 2-8-0 of 1904, SAR Class 8Z.
- Central South African Railways Class 9, SAR Class 9.
- Central South African Railways Class 10, SAR Class 10.
- Central South African Railways Class 10-2 Saturated, SAR Class 10A.
- Central South African Railways Class 10-2 Superheated. SAR Class 10B.
- Central South African Railways Class 10-C, SAR Class 10C.
- Central South African Railways Class 11, SAR Class 11.
- CGR 9th Class of 1903, SAR Class Experimental 4.
- CGR 9th Class of 1906, SAR Class Experimental 5.
- CGR 10th Class, SAR Class Experimental 6.
- SAR Class ME.
- Central South African Railways Mallet Superheated, SAR Class MF.

The second letter indicates the tender's water capacity. The "_E" tenders had a capacity of between 2,800 and 2,855 imperial gallons (12,700 and 13,000 litres; 3,360 and 3,430 US gallons).

A number, when added after the letter code, indicates differences between similar tender types, such as function, wheelbase or coal bunker capacity.

== Illustration ==
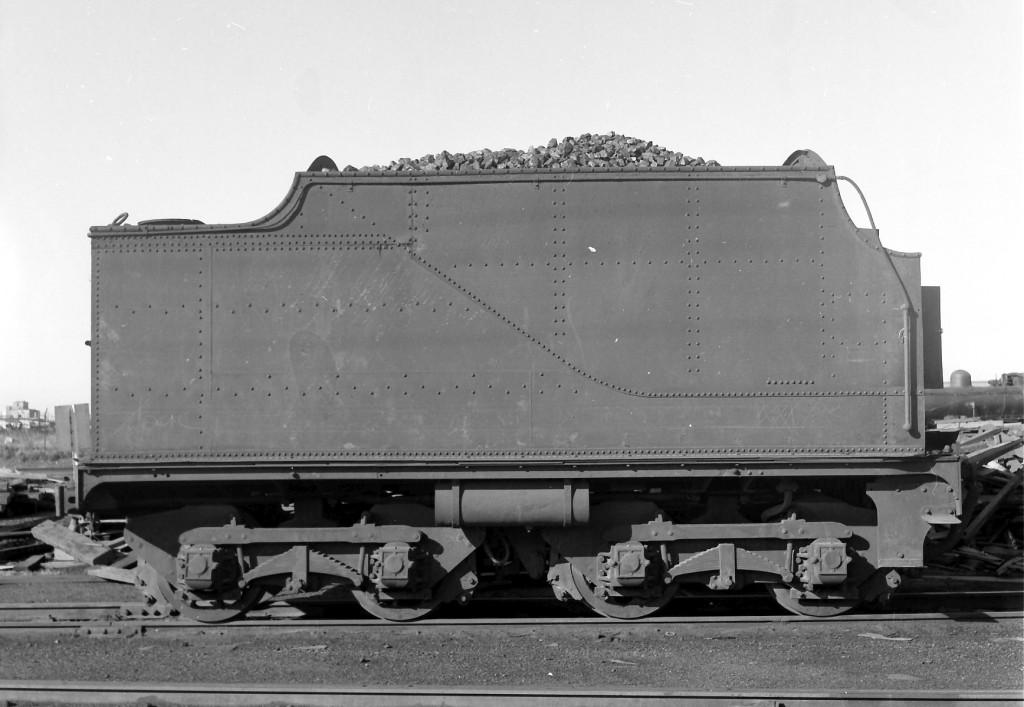
Rebuilt Type XE tender, c. 1970
