= South African type XM4 tender =

Steam locomotive introduced in 1911

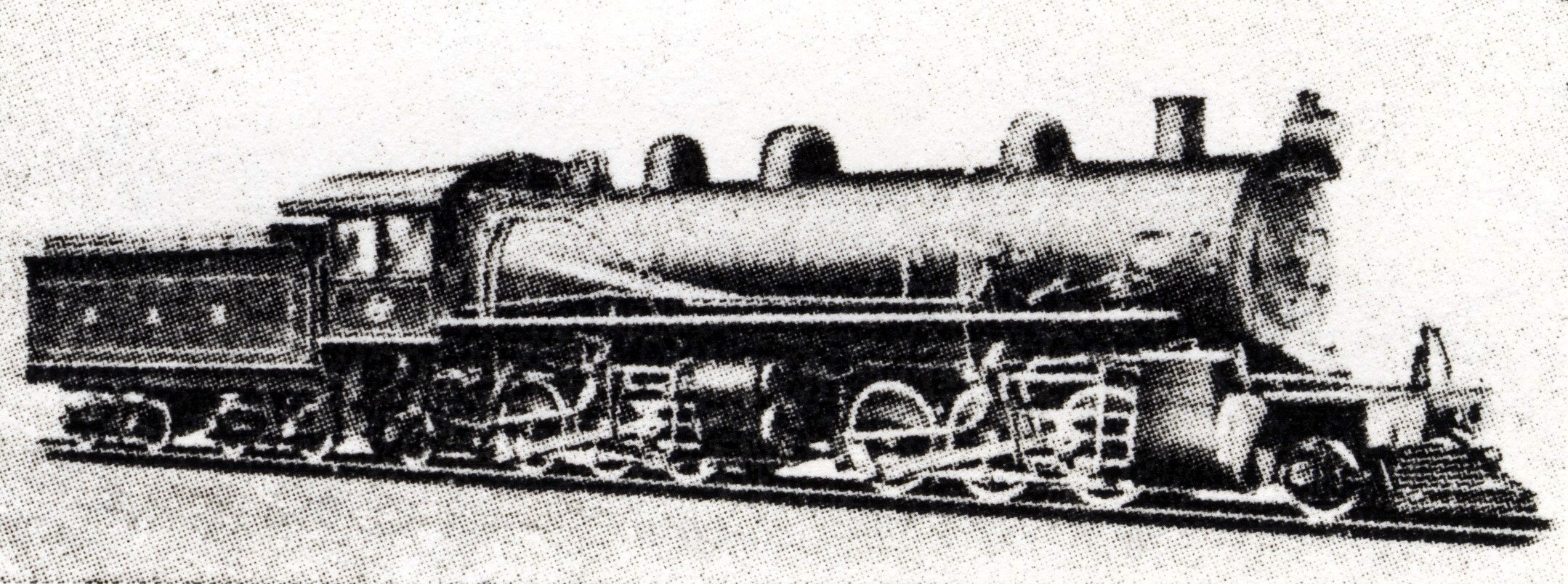
- Type XM4 tender on SAR Class MF
Type and origin
- Locomotive: SAR Class MF
- Designer: American Locomotive Company
- Builder: American Locomotive Company
- In service: 1911
Specifications
- Configuration: 2-axle bogies
- Gauge: 3 ft 6 in (1,067 mm) Cape gauge
- Bogies: Diamond frame
- Wheel dia.: 30 in (762 mm)
- Wheelbase: 17 ft 10 in (5,436 mm)
  - Bogie: 5 ft 10 in (1,778 mm)
- Axle load: 12 LT 15 cwt (12,950 kg) average
  - Bogie: 25 LT 10 cwt (25,910 kg) average
- Weight empty: 51,840 lb (23,510 kg)
- Weight w/o: 51 LT (51,820 kg)
- Fuel type: Coal
- Fuel cap.: 10 LT (10.2 t)
- Water cap.: 4,000 imp gal (18,200 L)
- Stoking: Manual
- Couplers: Drawbar & Johnston link-and-pin Drawbar & AAR knuckle (1930s)
Career
- Operators: South African Railways
- Numbers: SAR 1629-1633

The South African type XM4 tender was a steam locomotive tender.

Type XM4 tenders entered service in November 1911, as tenders to the second batch of 2-6-6-2 Superheated Mallet type steam locomotives which were delivered to the Central South African Railways in that year. These locomotives were designated Class MF on the South African Railways in 1912.

== Manufacturer ==
Type XM4 tenders were built in 1911 by the American Locomotive Company (ALCO).

In November 1911, the Central South African Railways (CSAR) placed a second batch of five 2-6-6-2 Mallet articulated compound steam locomotives in service, built by ALCO. These locomotives were designated Class MF on the South African Railways (SAR) in 1912. The Type XM4 tender entered service as tenders to these five engines.

== Characteristics ==
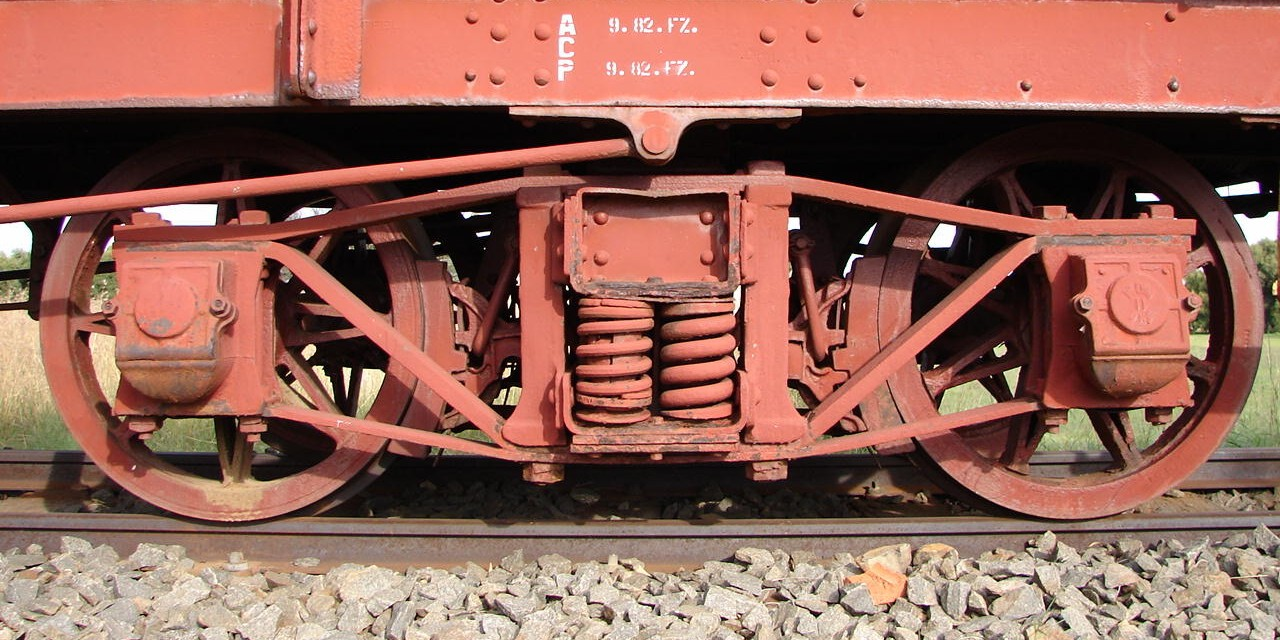
Diamond Frame bogie

As built, the tender had a coal capacity of 10 long tons (10.2 tonnes) and a water capacity of 4,000 imperial gallons (18,200 litres), with an average maximum axle load of 12 long tons 15 hundredweight (12,950 kilograms). It rode on diamond frame bogies with a 5 feet 10 inches (1,778 millimetres) wheelbase per bogie.

== Locomotive ==
In the SAR years, tenders were numbered for the engines they were delivered with. In most cases, an oval number plate, bearing the engine number and often also the tender type, would be attached to the rear end of the tender.

Only the second batch of five Class MF locomotives were delivered new with Type XM4 tenders. They were numbered in the range from 1629 to 1633, directly onto the SAR roster, marking the introduction of the SAR renumbering scheme under the Union programme.

== Classification letters ==
Since many tender types are interchangeable between different locomotive classes and types, a tender classification system was adopted by the SAR. The first letter of the tender type indicates the classes of engines to which it can be coupled. The "X_" tenders could be used with the locomotive classes as shown.

- Cape Government Railways Mountain, SAR Class 4.
- SAR Class 4A.
- SAR Class 5.
- Cape Government Railways 6th Class of 1897, SAR Class 6B.
- Oranje-Vrijstaat Gouwerment-Spoorwegen 6th Class L3, SAR Class 6E.
- Cape Government Railways 6th Class of 1901 (Neilson, Reid), SAR Class 6H.
- Cape Government Railways 6th Class of 1902, SAR Class 6J.
- Cape Government Railways 8th Class of 1902, SAR Class 8.
- Imperial Military Railways 8th Class, SAR Class 8A.
- CSAR Class 8-L2, SAR Class 8B.
- CSAR Class 8-L3, SAR Class 8C.
- Cape Government Railways 8th Class 4-8-0 of 1903, SAR Class 8D.
- Cape Government Railways 8th Class Experimental, SAR Class 8E.
- Cape Government Railways 8th Class 4-8-0 of 1904, SAR Class 8F.
- Cape Government Railways 8th Class 2-8-0 of 1903, SAR Class 8Y.
- Cape Government Railways 8th Class 2-8-0 of 1904, SAR Class 8Z.
- CSAR Class 9, SAR Class 9.
- CSAR Class 10, SAR Class 10.
- CSAR Class 10-2 Saturated, SAR Class 10A.
- CSAR Class 10-2 Superheated. SAR Class 10B.
- CSAR Class 10-C, SAR Class 10C.
- CSAR Class 11, SAR Class 11.
- Cape Government Railways 9th Class of 1903, SAR Class Experimental 4.
- Cape Government Railways 9th Class of 1906, SAR Class Experimental 5.
- Cape Government Railways 10th Class, SAR Class Experimental 6.
- SAR Class ME.
- CSAR Mallet Superheated, SAR Class MF.

The second letter indicates the tender's water capacity. The "_M" tenders had a capacity of 4,000 imperial gallons (18,200 litres; 4,800 US gallons).

A number, when added after the letter code, usually indicates differences between similar tender types, such as function, wheelbase or coal bunker capacity.
