= South African Class 11 2-8-2 =

1904 design of steam locomotive

CSAR Class 11 2-8-2 South African Class 11 2-8-2
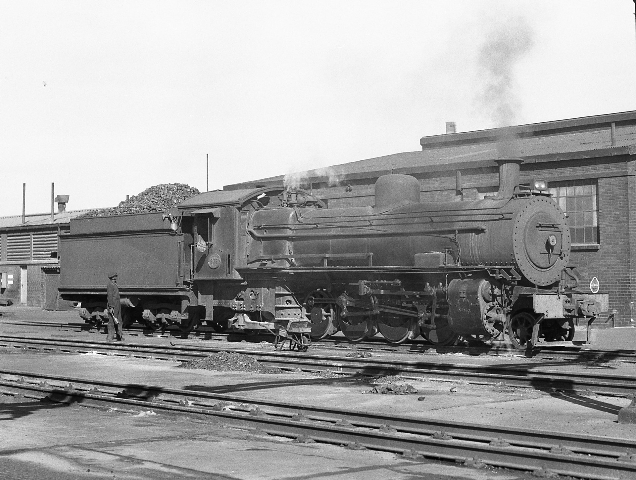
- Class 11 no. 933, ex CSAR no. 721, Sydenham, 1973
Type and origin
- Power type: Steam
- Designer: Central South African Railways (P.A. Hyde)
- Builder: North British Locomotive Company
- Serial number: 16207, 16250-16284
- Model: CSAR Class 11
- Build date: 1904
- Total produced: 36
Specifications
- Configuration
  - Whyte: 2-8-2 (Mikado)
  - UIC: 1'D1'h2
- Driver: 3rd coupled axle
- Gauge: 3 ft 6 in (1,067 mm) Cape gauge
- Leading dia.: 30 in (762 mm)
- Coupled dia.: 48 in (1,219 mm)
- Trailing dia.: 30 in (762 mm)
- Tender wheels: 33 1/2 in (851 mm) as built 34 in (864 mm) retyred
- Wheelbase: 55 ft 8 in (16,967 mm)
  - Engine: 29 ft 3 in (8,915 mm)
  - Coupled: 13 ft 1 1/2 in (4,000 mm)
  - Tender: 16 ft 9 in (5,105 mm)
  - Tender bogie: 4 ft 7 in (1,397 mm)
- Length
  - Over couplers: 64 ft 4 1/2 in (19,622 mm)
- Height: 12 ft 10 in (3,912 mm)
- Frame type: Plate
- Axle load: 15 LT 15 cwt (16,000 kg)
  - Leading: 6 LT 1 cwt (6,147 kg)
  - 1st coupled: 15 LT 4 cwt (15,440 kg)
  - 2nd coupled: 15 LT 12 cwt (15,850 kg)
  - 3rd coupled: 15 LT 15 cwt (16,000 kg)
  - 4th coupled: 15 LT 15 cwt (16,000 kg)
  - Trailing: 11 LT 7 cwt (11,530 kg)
  - Tender bogie: Bogie 1: 24 LT 4 cwt (24,590 kg); Bogie 2: 25 LT 3 cwt (25,550 kg)
  - Tender axle: 12 LT 11 cwt 2 qtr (12,780 kg)
- Adhesive weight: 62 LT 6 cwt (63,300 kg)
- Loco weight: 79 LT 14 cwt (80,980 kg)
- Tender weight: 49 LT 7 cwt (50,140 kg)
- Total weight: 129 LT 1 cwt (131,100 kg)
- Tender type: XM2 (2-axle bogies); XC, XC1, XE, XE1, XF, XF1, XF2, XJ, XM, XM1, XM2, XM3, XM4, XP1, XS permitted
- Fuel type: Coal
- Fuel capacity: 10 LT (10.2 t)
- Water cap.: 4,000 imp gal (18,200 L)
- Firebox
  - Type: Belpaire
  - Grate area: 37 sq ft (3.4 m^{2})
- Boiler
  - Pitch: 7 ft 2 in (2,184 mm)
  - Diameter: 5 ft 1 3/4 in (1,568 mm)
  - Tube plates: 18 ft 1/4 in (5,493 mm)
  - Small tubes: 121 2 1/4 in (57 mm)
  - Large tubes: 21: 5 1/2 in (140 mm)
- Boiler pressure: 190 psi (1,310 kPa)
- Safety valve: Ramsbottom
- Heating surface
  - Firebox: 142 sq ft (13.2 m^{2})
  - Tubes: 1,829 sq ft (169.9 m^{2})
  - Total surface: 1,971 sq ft (183.1 m^{2})
- Superheater
  - Heating area: 331 sq ft (30.8 m^{2})
- Cylinders: Two
- Cylinder size: 20 in (508 mm) bore 26 in (660 mm) stroke
- Valve gear: Walschaerts
- Valve type: Piston
- Couplers: Johnston link-and-pin AAR knuckle (1930s)
Performance figures
- Tractive effort: 30,780 lbf (136.9 kN) @ 75%
Career
- Operators: Central South African Railways; South African Railways; Freegold; Tavistock Colliery; Blue Circle Cement
- Class: CSAR & SAR Class 11
- Number in class: 36
- Numbers: CSAR 700-735, SAR 912-947
- Delivered: 1904
- First run: 1904
- Withdrawn: 1975
- The 2nd & 3rd coupled axles had flangeless wheels

The South African Railways Class 11 2-8-2 of 1904 was a steam locomotive from the pre-Union era in Transvaal Colony.

In 1904, the Central South African Railways placed 36 Class 11 steam locomotives with a 2-8-2 Mikado type wheel arrangement in service. When these locomotives were assimilated into the South African Railways in 1912, they were renumbered but retained their Class 11 classification.

== Manufacturer ==
Built by the North British Locomotive Company (NBL), the Class 11 was designed for goods train service on the Reef by P.A. Hyde, Chief Locomotive Superintendent of the Central South African Railways (CSAR) from 1902 to 1904. One locomotive, CSAR no. 700, was delivered early in 1904 for trial purposes. After successful trials, this locomotive was followed by a further 35 Class 11 locomotives which were delivered later that same year and numbered in the range from 701 to 735.

== Characteristics ==
The Class 11 was designed by Hyde to take full advantage of the new 80 pounds per yard (40 kilograms per metre) track of the CSAR which was gradually replacing the old 60 pounds per yard (30 kilograms per metre) sections on mainlines. Upon delivery, however, the class was found to be too heavy for a large part of the existing track and bridges on the line between Witbank and Germiston, where they were intended to work. It took nearly a year to carry out the programme of track and bridge strengthening and some of the new locomotives ended up being held in staging for all that time before the Chief Civil Engineer would allow them to run.

When introduced, these engines were up to date with contemporary locomotive practice. They were superheated, with Belpaire fireboxes. The cylinders were arranged outside the plate frames, with the 10 inches (254 millimetres) diameter outside admission piston valves arranged above the cylinders and actuated by Walschaerts valve gear. The drivers and intermediate coupled wheels were flangeless. The motion, axleboxes and several other details were identical or similar to equivalent parts of the Class 10, which was built at the same time by the same manufacturer, and their Type XM2 two-axle bogie tenders were identical.

The load-bearing springs of the trailing bissel consisted of single helical springs of round section. Since the single spring would not stand up to the load, it was soon replaced by a double spring. Laminated springs were subsequently fitted. Apart from this, the engines were trouble-free and gave more than seventy years of service. After withdrawal, many were sold into industrial service and some of these reached almost 100 years in service.

The Class 11 were powerful locomotives which gave good service at moderate speeds, but at higher speed the lightly loaded leading Bissel truck with its 6 long tons 1 hundredweight (6,147 kilograms) axle load proved unsatisfactory on curves.

== South African Railways ==
When the Union of South Africa was established on 31 May 1910, the three Colonial government railways (Cape Government Railways, Natal Government Railways and CSAR) were united under a single administration to control and administer the railways, ports and harbours of the Union. Although the South African Railways and Harbours came into existence in 1910, the actual classification and renumbering of all the rolling stock of the three constituent railways were only implemented with effect from 1 January 1912.

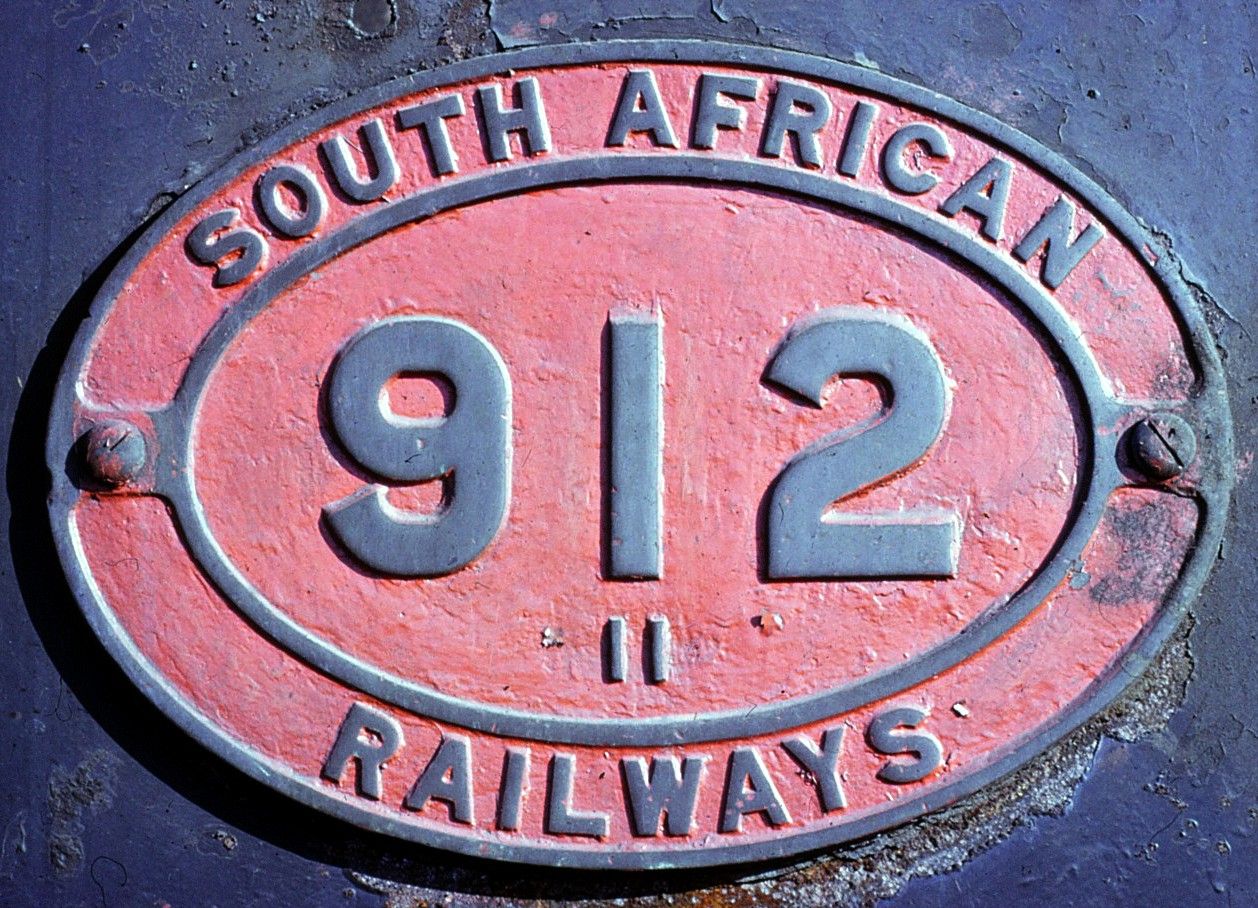

In 1912, the CSAR Class 11 locomotives were renumbered in the range from 912 to 947, but their Class 11 classification was retained on the South African Railways (SAR).

The 2-8-2 Mikado type was rare in SAR service, the Class 11 and the narrow gauge Class NG15 Kalahari being the only South African Mikado types to be built in quantity. Apart from these, the SAR had the temporary use on lease of a few Katanga Mikados to alleviate a locomotive shortage during the First World War.

== Service ==
=== Railways ===
The Witbank line was of such significant strategic importance that, as new and more powerful locomotives were placed in service, these often started their service life on this line. On the Witbank line, the Class 11's loads were later reduced from 1,050 to 900 long tons (1,067 to 914 tonnes) to reduce running times. This enabled them to run the double trip of 80 miles (129 kilometres) in each direction. When increased traffic between Witbank and Germiston and the consequent congestion began to cause considerable detention en-route which imposed excessive hours of duty on the trainmen, the Class 11 began to be replaced by Mallet type locomotives capable of handling loads of 1,600 long tons (1,626 tonnes) at an average speed of 9 to 10 miles per hour (14 to 16 kilometres per hour). On the Mallets, the trainmen once again worked single trips only.

When replaced by more powerful locomotives, the Class 11 was relegated to local workings and shunting duties. In the 1940s, most of them were relocated to the Cape Northern system, shedded at Kimberley, and the Cape Midlands system, shedded at Port Elizabeth, where they were employed on similar tasks until they were withdrawn from SAR service in 1975.

=== Industrial ===
Fifteen of the Class 11 locomotives were sold into industrial service, and sometimes resold. All are now withdrawn from service.

- SAR no. 918 became President Brand Gold Mine no. 7 and later Freegold no. 8.
- SAR no. 921 went to Witbank Coal Mine and later became Tavistock Colliery no. 2.
- SAR no. 923 became Western Holdings no. 6.
- SAR no. 926 became President Brand Gold Mine no. 6.
- SAR no. 928 became President Steyn Gold Mine no. 8 and later Freegold no. 5.
- SAR no. 929 became President Steyn Gold Mine no. 6.
- SAR no. 932 became President Brand Gold Mine no. 8.
- SAR no. 933 became President Steyn Gold Mine no. 7 and later Freegold no. 7.
- SAR no. 936 went to ISCOR in Pretoria and later became Tavistock Colliery no. 1.
- SAR no. 938 went to President Brand Gold Mine for spare parts.
- SAR no. 940 went to ISCOR in Pretoria, later became South Witbank Colliery no. 6 and then Umgala Colliery no. 1 at Utrecht.
- SAR no. 943 went to South Witbank Coal Mine and later became Tavistock Colliery no. 3.
- SAR no. 944 became Free State Geduld Gold Mine no. 6 and later Freegold no. 6.
- SAR no. 945 became Free State Saaiplaas Gold Mine no. 2.
- SAR no. 946 went to Blue Circle Cement in Lichtenburg and is now part of a static display at the Andries Beyers Farming Museum in Lichtenburg.

== Modification ==
As built, the Class 11 had a gap between the running boards and the platform in front of the smokebox, with a stirrup-type step attached to the front edge of each running board and without side-steps at the locomotive's front. Many were later modified by having sloped extensions added between the running boards and the front platform to replace the stirrup, and with side-steps added next to the leading wheels. Some were modified in this way while still in SAR service, while others were done in various styles by their post-SAR industrial owners, as illustrated below.

While most other SAR locomotives with Belpaire fireboxes were later reboilered with the Watson Standard boilers which were introduced in the 1930s, no Class 11 locomotive ever underwent this modification. They served in the SAR for seventy years plus several more years in industrial service while retaining the distinctive appearance which comes with a Belpaire firebox.

== Preservation ==
Number	Works nmr	THF / Private	Leaselend / Owner	Current Location	Outside South Africa	?
918	NBL / 16255	Private	Steamnet 2000	Kimberley Locomotive Depot		
929	NBL / 16266	Private	Sandstone Estate	Bloemfontein Locomotive Depot		
933	NBL / 16270	THF	MUSEUM	Bloemfontein Locomotive Depot		
942	NBL / 16279	THF	Plinth	Witbank (Station)		
946	NBL / 16283	Private	Agricultural Museum	Lichtenburg		

== Illustration ==
The main picture and the following photographs illustrate some of the modifications done to the running boards of the Class 11 locomotive, as well as the SAR and industrial liveries which were applied to it.

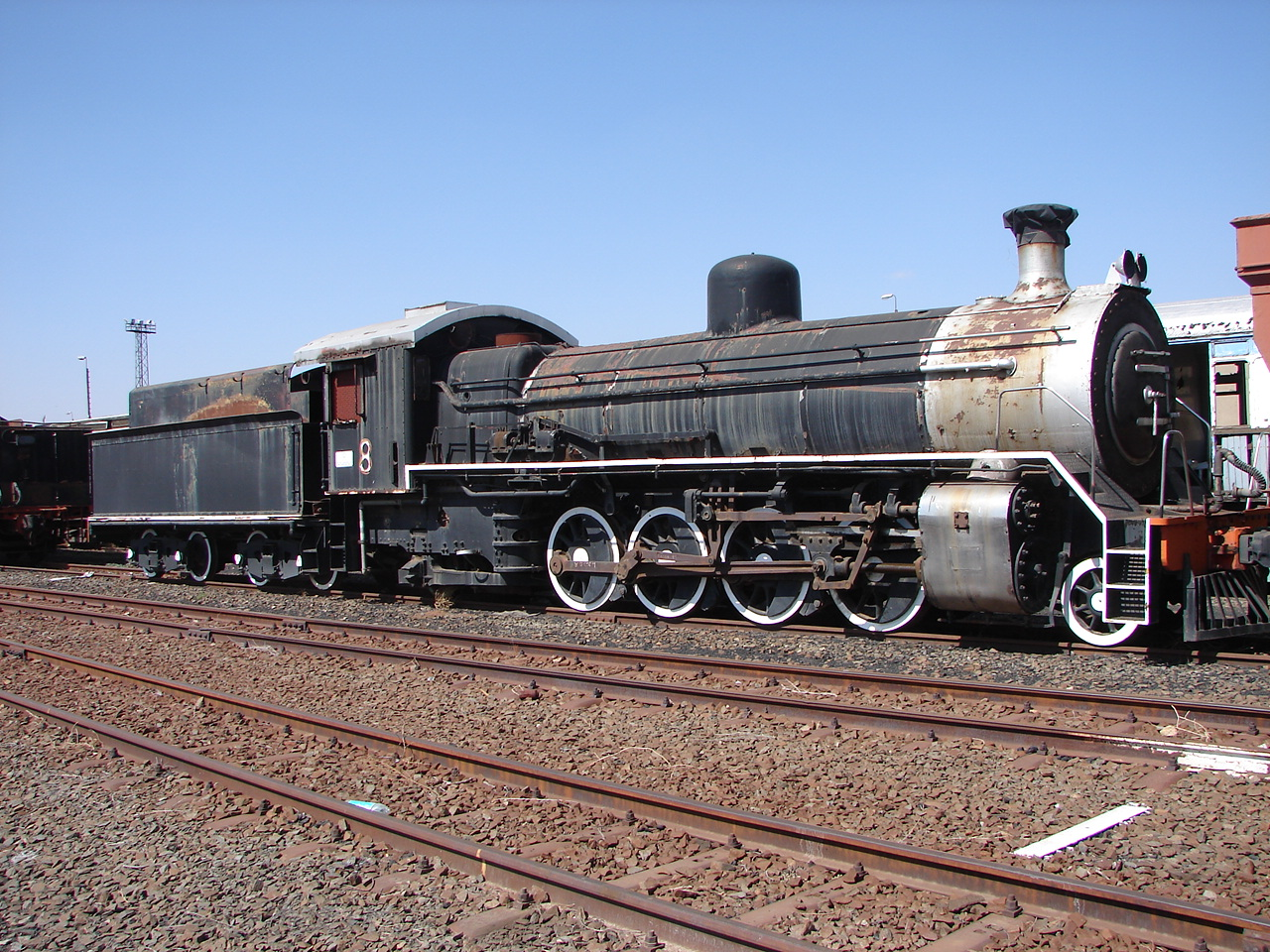
SAR no. 918, CSAR no. 706, Freegold no. 8, Beaconsfield, 25 Aug 2007

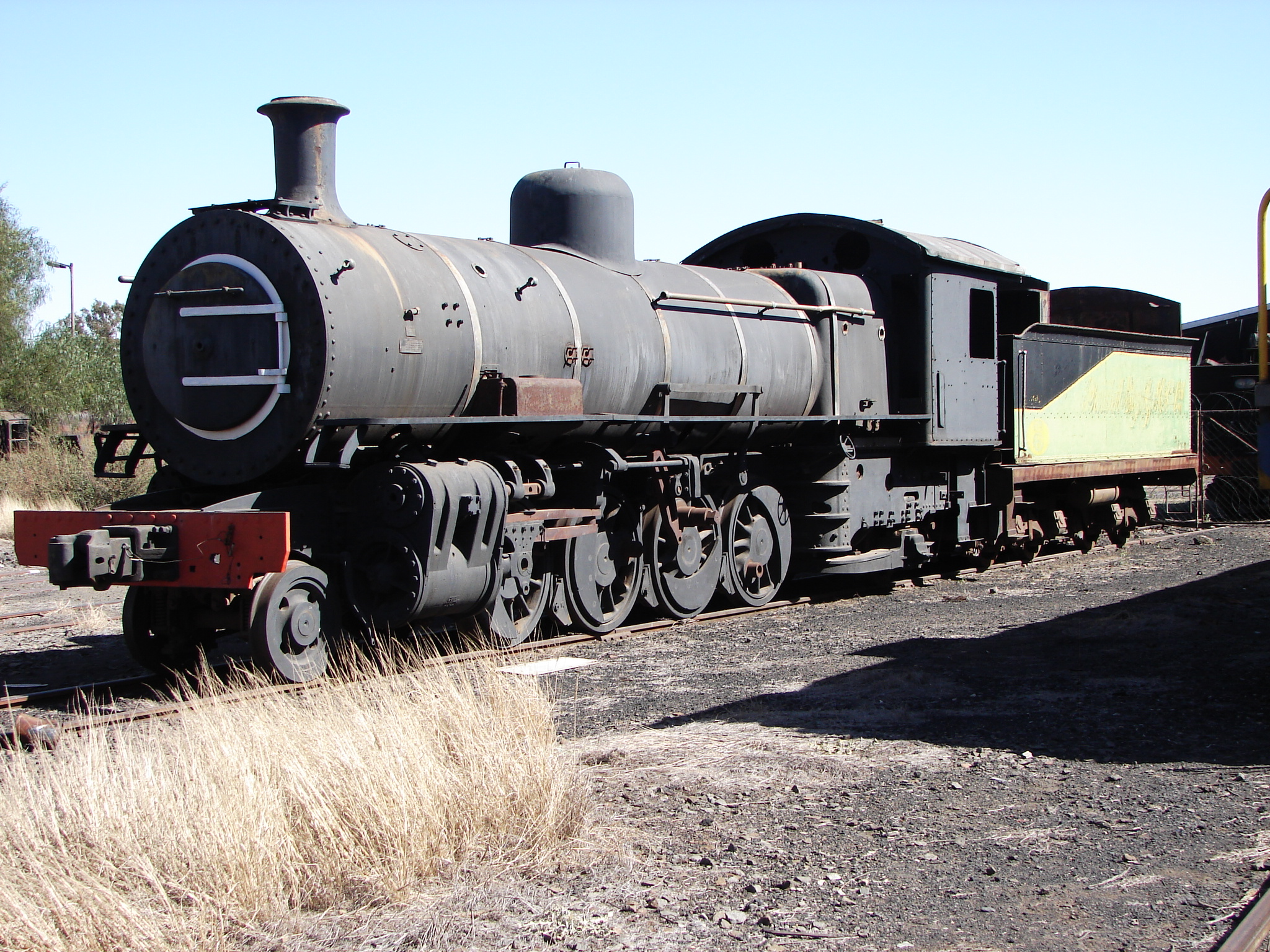
SAR no. 929, CSAR no. 717, President Steyn no. 6, Bloemfontein, 18 Sep 2015

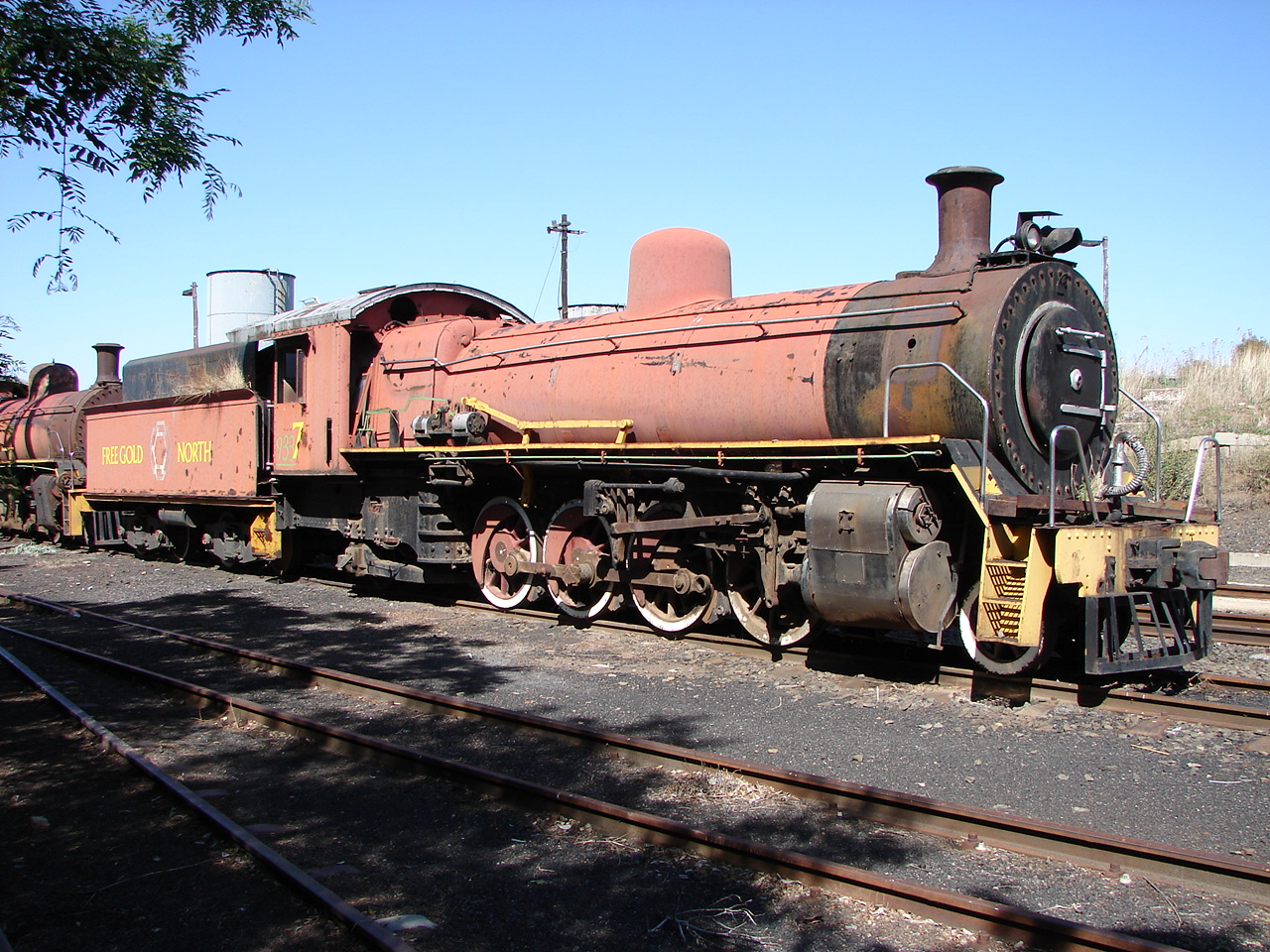
SAR no. 933, CSAR no. 721, Freegold no. 7, Bloemfontein, 14 Oct 2009

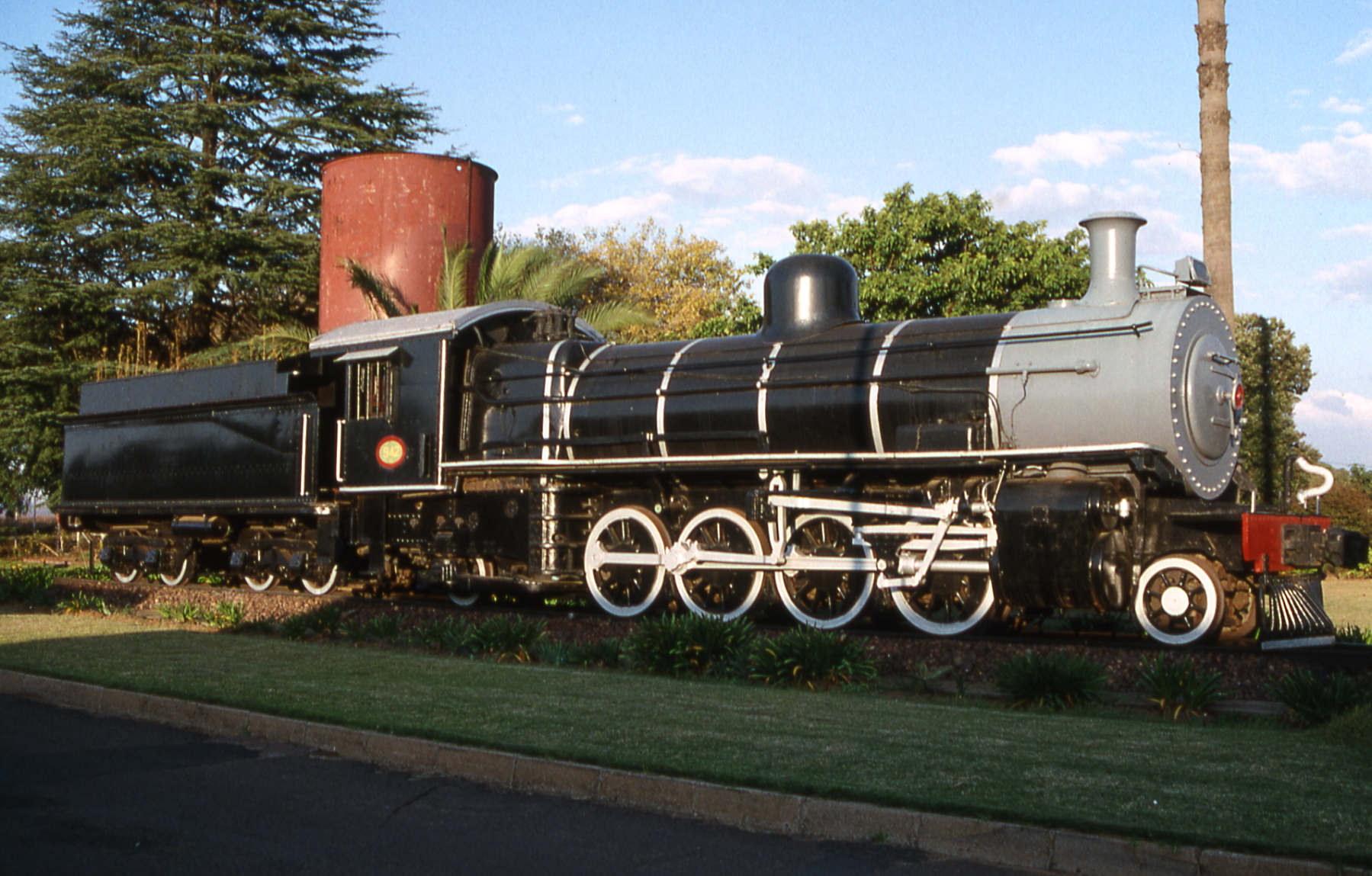
SAR no. 942, CSAR no. 730, plinthed outside Witbank station, Apr 1993

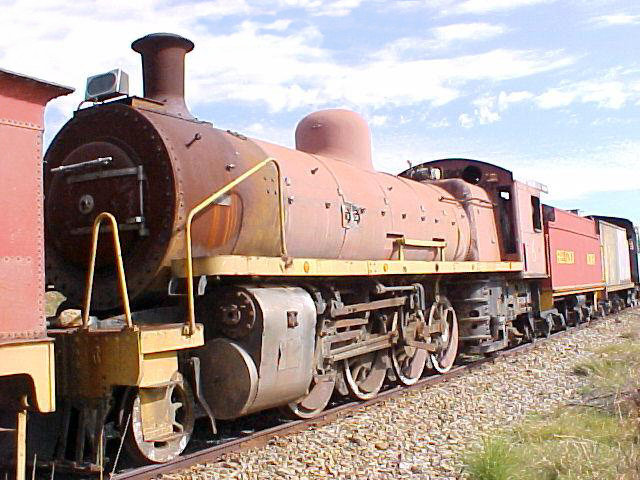
SAR no. 944, CSAR no. 732, Freegold no. 6, Odendaalsrus, 29 May 2005

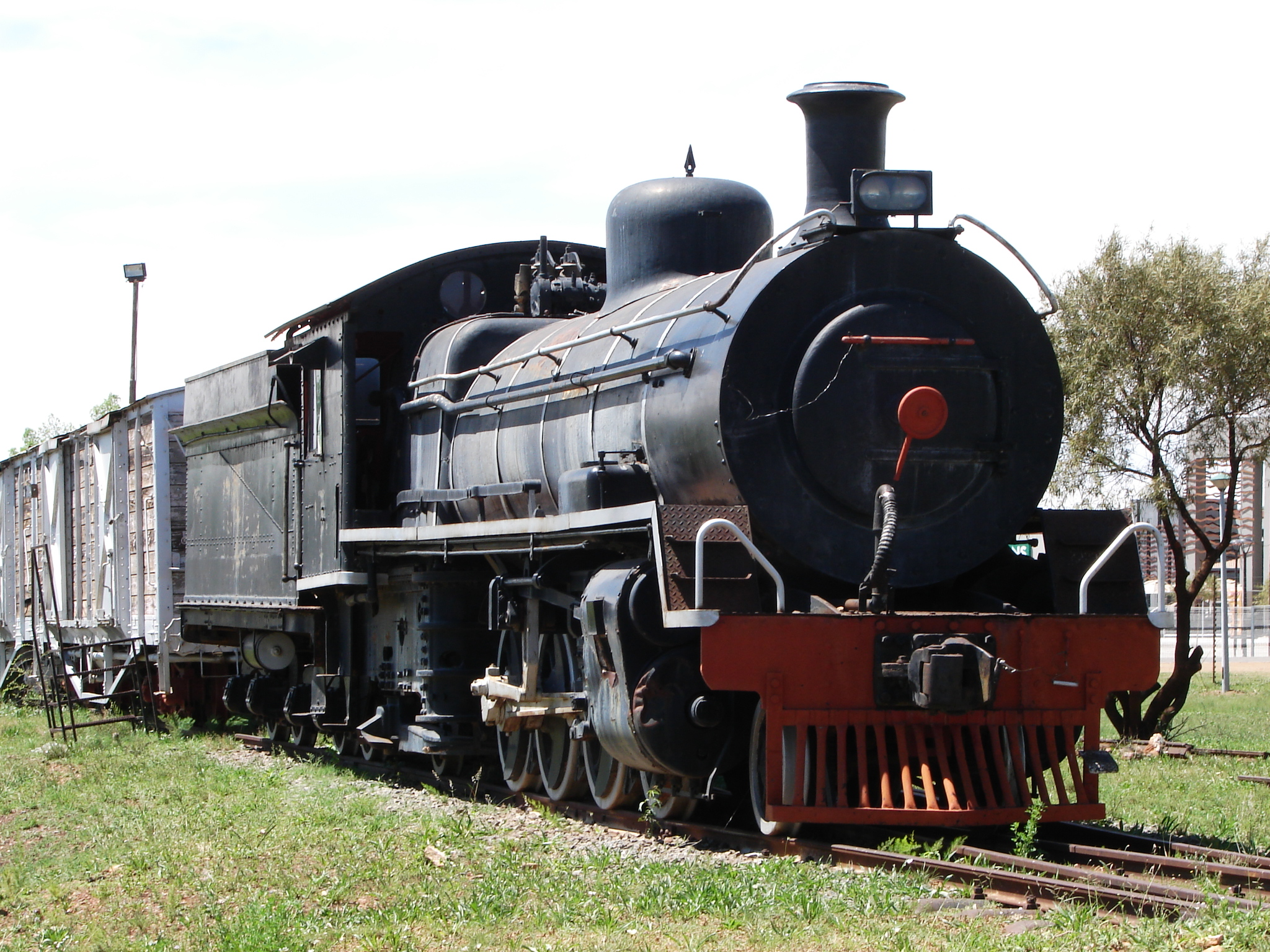
SAR no. 946, CSAR no. 734, plinthed at Lichtenburg, 2 Oct 2015
