= South African type XC1 tender =

Steam locomotive tender

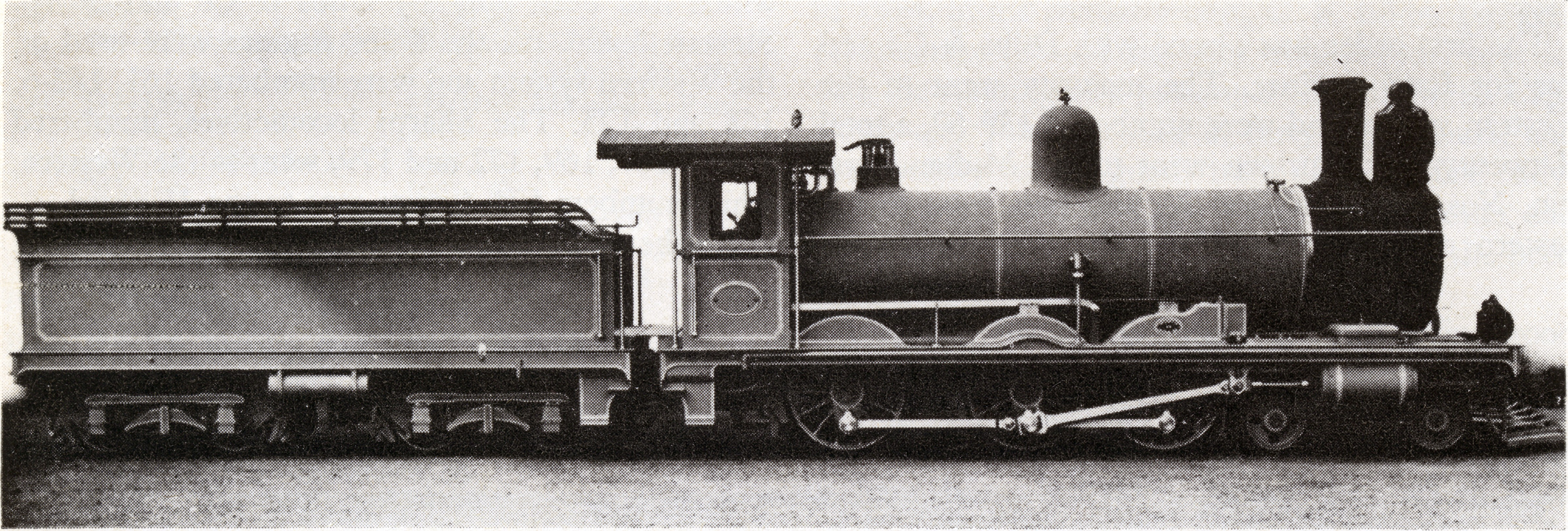
- Type XC1 tender on CGR 6th Class of 1897
Type and origin
- Locomotive: CGR 6th Class of 1897; OVGS 6th Class L3
- Designer: Cape Government Railways (H.M. Beatty)
- Builder: Dübs and Company; Neilson and Company; Neilson, Reid and Company; Sharp, Stewart and Company
- In service: 1897-1898
- Rebuilder: South African Railways
- Rebuild date: c. 1925
- Rebuilt to: Type XE
Specifications
- Configuration: 2-axle bogies
- Gauge: 3 ft 6 in (1,067 mm) Cape gauge
- Length: 23 ft 9 1/8 in (7,242 mm)
- Wheel dia.: 33 1/2 in (851 mm) as built 34 in (864 mm) retyred
- Wheelbase: 16 ft 1 in (4,902 mm)
  - Bogie: 4 ft 7 in (1,397 mm)
- Axle load: 8 LT 16 cwt 2 qtr (8,967 kg)
  - Front bogie: 16 LT 12 cwt (16,870 kg)
  - Rear bogie: 17 LT 13 cwt (17,930 kg)
- Weight empty: 38,400 lb (17,400 kg)
- Weight w/o: 34 LT 5 cwt (34,800 kg)
- Fuel type: Coal
- Fuel cap.: 5 LT 10 cwt (5.6 t)
- Water cap.: 2,600 imp gal (11,820 L)
- Stoking: Manual
- Couplers: Drawbar & Johnston link-and-pin Drawbar & AAR knuckle (1930s)
Career
- Operators: Cape Government Railways; OVGS; Imperial Military Railways; Central South African Railways; Benguela Railway; South African Railways
- Numbers: SAR 490-540, 598-603

The South African type XC1 tender was a steam locomotive tender from the pre-Union era in the Cape of Good Hope.

The Type XC1 tender first entered service in 1897, as tenders to the third batch of 6th Class 4-6-0 Tenwheeler type steam locomotives to be acquired by the Cape Government Railways. These locomotives were designated Class 6B on the South African Railways in 1912.

== Manufacturers ==
Type XC1 tenders were built in 1897 and 1898 by Dübs and Company, Neilson and Company, Neilson, Reid and Company and Sharp, Stewart and Company.

The original 6th Class locomotive and tender had been designed at the Salt River works of the Cape Government Railways (CGR) in Cape Town in 1892, under the supervision of Western System Locomotive Superintendent H.M. Beatty. In 1897 and 1898, the CGR placed a third batch of 55 6th Class 4-6-0 steam locomotives in service, which would be designated Class 6B on the South African Railways (SAR) in 1912.

The Type XC1 entered service as tenders to these locomotives. More entered service in 1898, as tenders to the Oranje-Vrijstaat Gouwerment-Spoorwegen (OVGS) 6th Class L3.

== Characteristics ==
As built, the tender had a maximum axle load of 8 long tons 16 hundredweight 2 quarters (8,967 kilograms), a coal capacity of 5 long tons 10 hundredweight (5.6 tonnes) and a water capacity of 2,600 imperial gallons (11,800 litres; 3,120 US gallons).

== Locomotives ==
In the SAR years, tenders were numbered for the engines they were delivered with. In most cases, an oval number plate, bearing the engine number and often also the locomotive class and tender type, would be attached to the rear end of the tender. During the classification and renumbering of locomotives onto the SAR roster in 1912, no separate classification and renumbering list was published for tenders, which should have been renumbered according to the locomotive renumbering list.

Two locomotive classes were delivered new with Type XC1 tenders. Bearing in mind that tenders could and did migrate between engines, these tenders should have been numbered in the SAR number ranges as shown.

- 1897: CGR 6th Class of 1897, SAR Class 6B, numbers 490 to 540.
- 1898: OVGS 6th Class L3, SAR Class 6E, numbers 598 to 603.

== Classification letters ==
Since many tender types are interchangeable between different locomotive classes and types, a tender classification system was adopted by the SAR. The first letter of the tender type indicates the classes of engines to which it can be coupled. The "X_" tenders could be used with the locomotive classes as shown.

- CGR Mountain, SAR Class 4.
- SAR Class 4A.
- SAR Class 5.
- CGR 6th Class of 1897, SAR Class 6B.
- OVGS 6th Class L3, SAR Class 6E.
- CGR 6th Class of 1901 (Neilson, Reid), SAR Class 6H.
- CGR 6th Class of 1902, SAR Class 6J.
- CGR 8th Class of 1902, SAR Class 8.
- Imperial Military Railways 8th Class, SAR Class 8A.
- Central South African Railways Class 8-L2, SAR Class 8B.
- Central South African Railways Class 8-L3, SAR Class 8C.
- CGR 8th Class 4-8-0 of 1903, SAR Class 8D.
- CGR 8th Class Experimental, SAR Class 8E.
- CGR 8th Class 4-8-0 of 1904, SAR Class 8F.
- CGR 8th Class 2-8-0 of 1903, SAR Class 8Y.
- CGR 8th Class 2-8-0 of 1904, SAR Class 8Z.
- Central South African Railways Class 9, SAR Class 9.
- Central South African Railways Class 10, SAR Class 10.
- Central South African Railways Class 10-2 Saturated, SAR Class 10A.
- Central South African Railways Class 10-2 Superheated. SAR Class 10B.
- Central South African Railways Class 10-C, SAR Class 10C.
- Central South African Railways Class 11, SAR Class 11.
- CGR 9th Class of 1903, SAR Class Experimental 4.
- CGR 9th Class of 1906, SAR Class Experimental 5.
- CGR 10th Class, SAR Class Experimental 6.
- SAR Class ME.
- Central South African Railways Mallet Superheated, SAR Class MF.

The second letter indicates the tender's water capacity. The "_C" tenders had a capacity of between 2,590 and 2,600 imperial gallons (11,770 and 11,820 litres; 3,110 and 3,122 US gallons).

A number, when added after the letter code, indicates differences between similar tender types, such as function, wheelbase or coal bunker capacity.

== Modifications and rebuilding ==
=== Modification ===
Builder's works pictures of the Classes 6B and 6E show them with the same 5 long tons 10 hundredweight (5.6 tonnes) coal capacity Type XC1 tender.

Pictures of most of these locomotives in service, however, show them with Type XC1 tenders with built-up sides to the coal bunker, to increase the coal capacity. Early versions of the built-up coal bunker sides were in the form of a slatted open-top cage, made of rectangular steel rods. In the second example depicted, one of the four CGR locomotives which were sold to the Benguela Railway in Angola in 1907 is shown with a Type XC1 tender with such a slatted extension of extraordinary proportions. Later SAR versions were constructed of sheet-metal.

=== Rebuilding to Type XE ===
From c. 1925, some of the Type XC1 tenders were rebuilt by the SAR by mounting a completely new upper structure on the existing underframe, with new water tanks and a larger coal capacity. These rebuilt tenders had a more modern appearance, with flush sides all the way to the top of the coal bunker. They had a coal capacity of 8 long tons (8.1 tonnes), a water capacity of 2,850 imperial gallons (13,000 litres) and were reclassified as Type XE.

The program to rebuild several older tender types with new upper structures was begun by Col F.R. Collins DSO, who approved several of the detailed drawings for the work during his term in office as Chief Mechanical Engineer of the SAR from 1922 to 1929. It was continued by his successor, A.G. Watson.

== Illustration ==
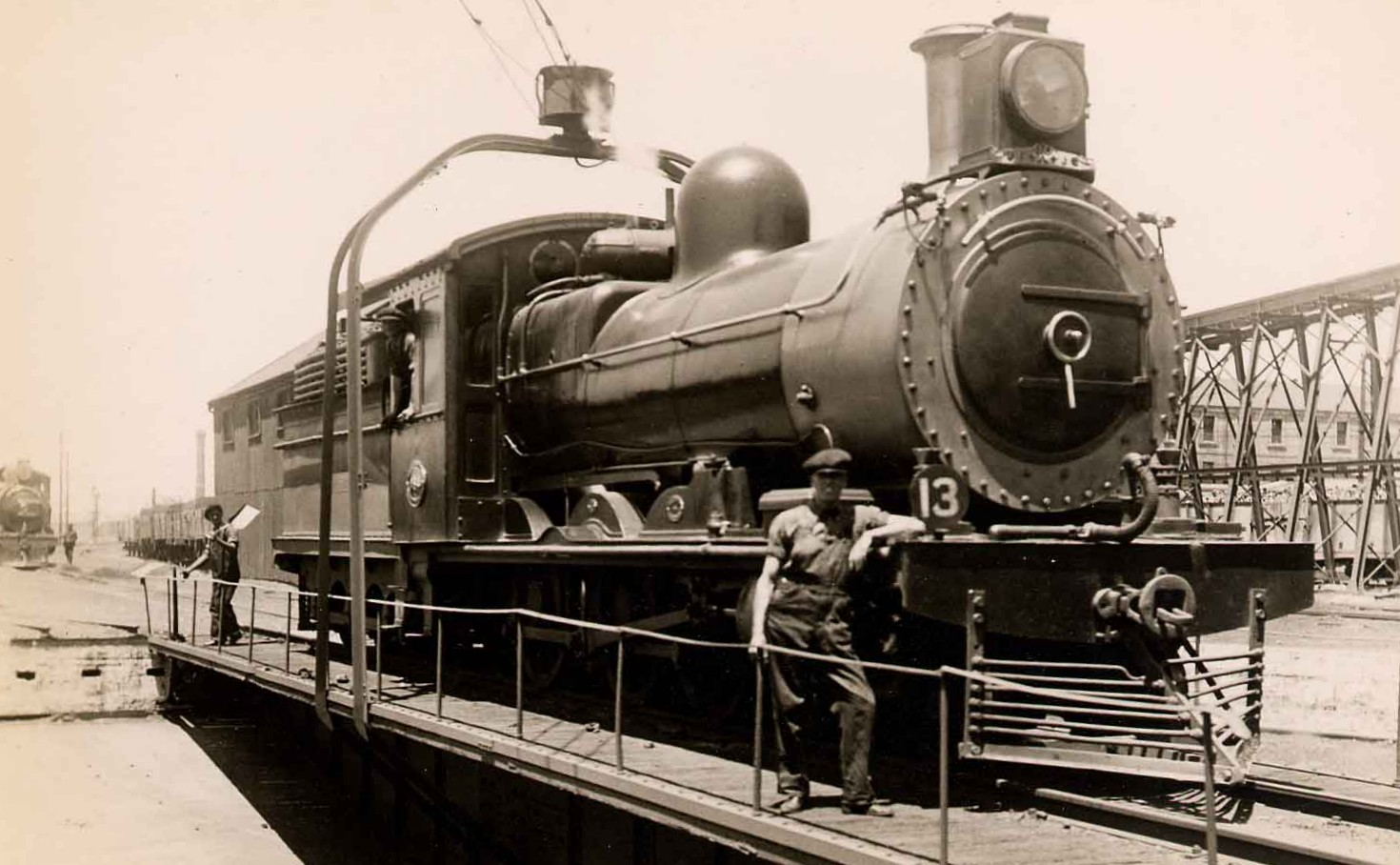
Type XC1 with slatted top on SAR Class 6B, c. 1930

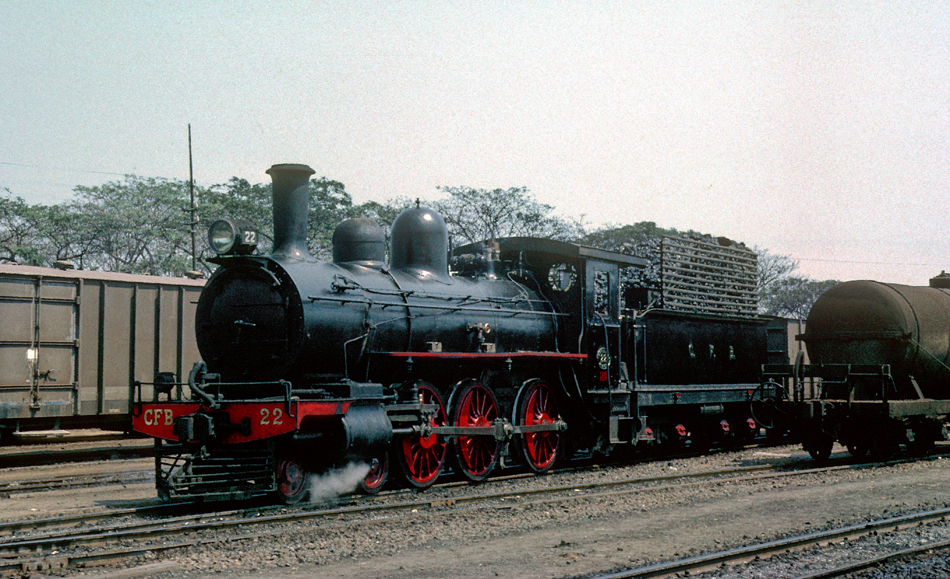
Type XC1 with slatted top on Benguela Railway 6th Class, 1972

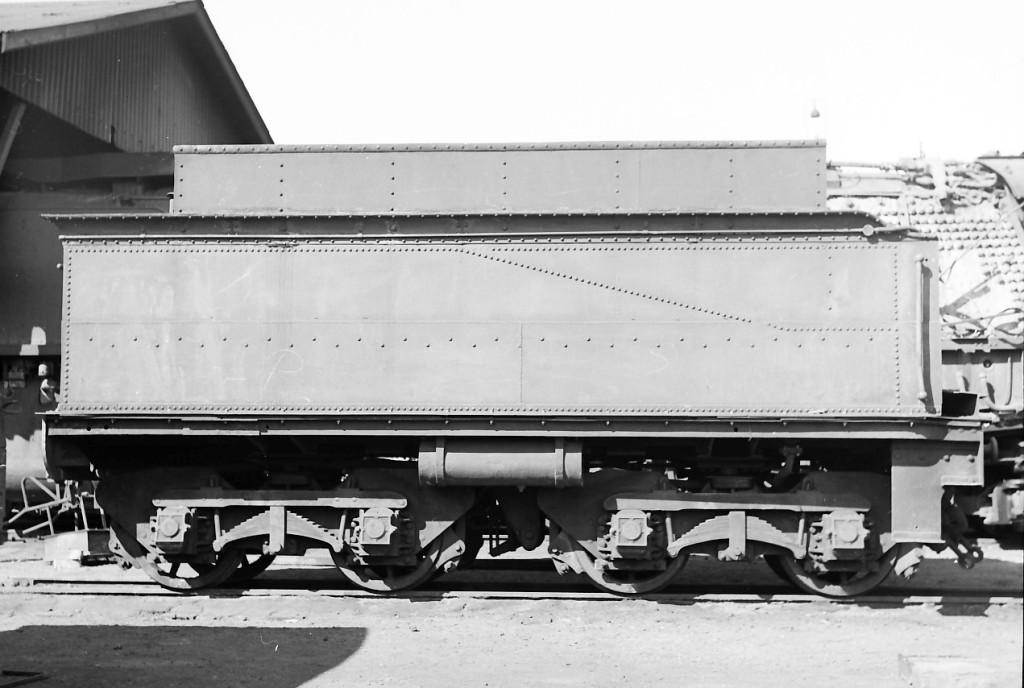
Type XC1 with sheet-metal top, c. 1970

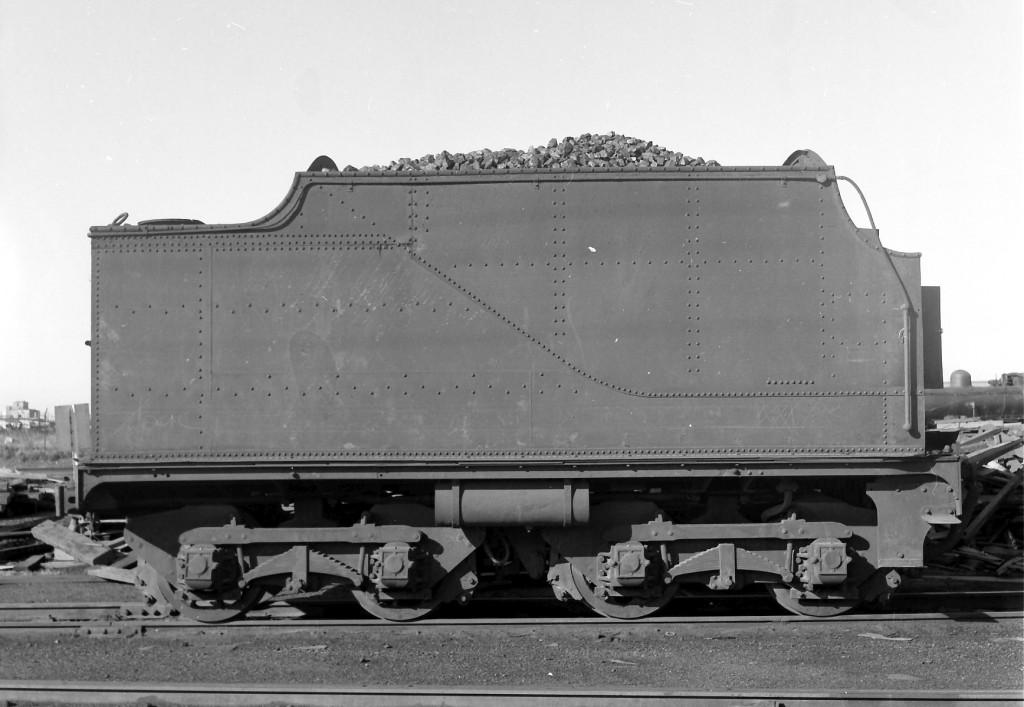
Rebuilt Type XE tender, c. 1970
