= South African Class 6B 4-6-0 =

1897 design of steam locomotive

CGR 6th Class 4-6-0 1897 South African Class 6B 4-6-0
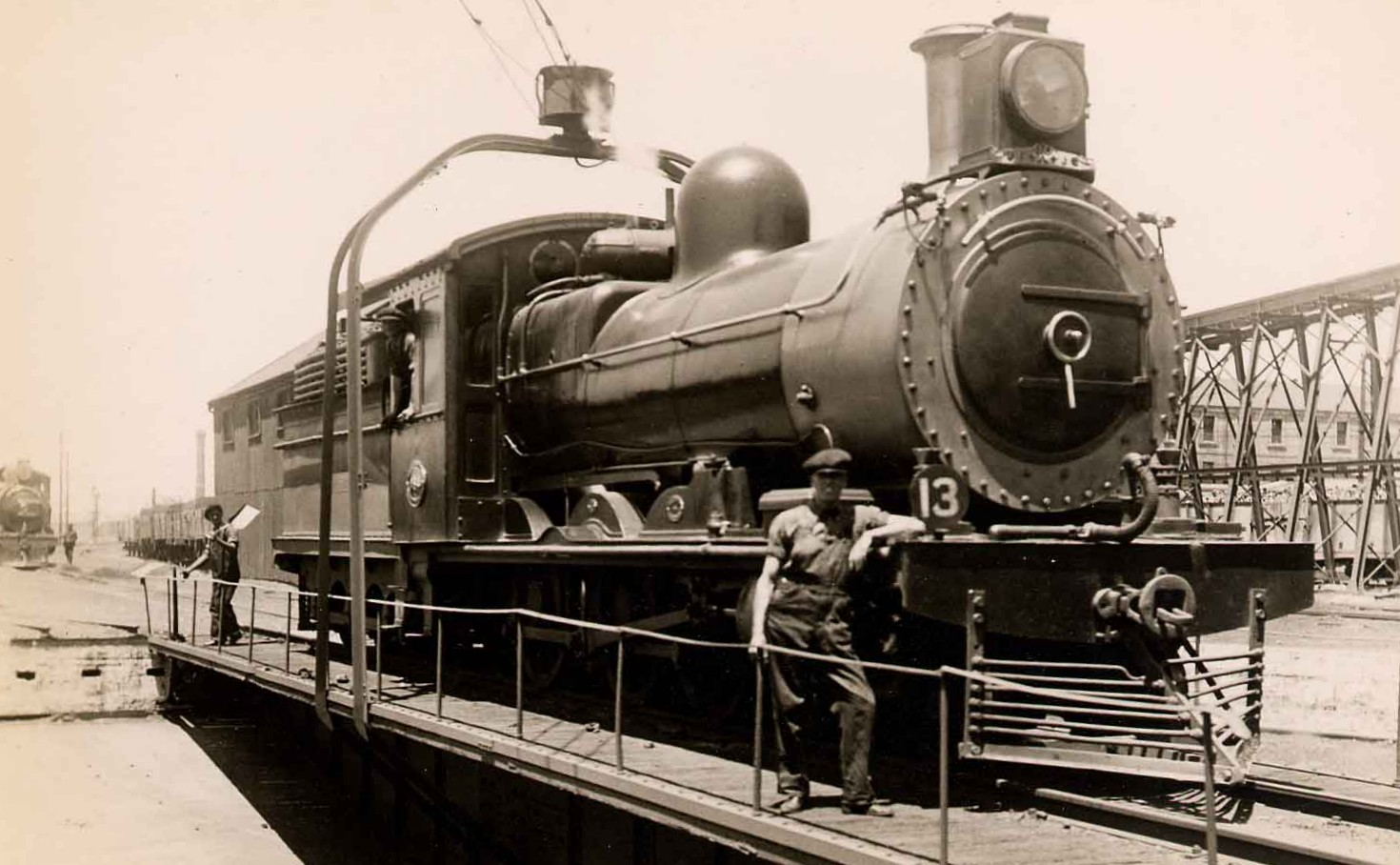
- CGR 6th Class no. 206, SAR Class 6B no. 494, c. 1930
Type and origin
- ♠ Original locomotive, as built ♥ Locomotive equipped with Belpaire firebox
- Power type: Steam
- Designer: Cape Government Railways (H.M. Beatty)
- Builder: Dübs and Company; Neilson and Company; Neilson, Reid and Company
- Serial number: Dübs 3467–3468, 3472–3474; Neilson 5120–5125, 5128–5129, 5131–5159; Neilson, Reid 5273–5279, 5319–5324
- Model: CGR 6th Class
- Build date: 1897–1898
- Total produced: 55
Specifications
- Configuration
  - Whyte: 4-6-0 (Tenwheeler)
  - UIC: 2'Cn2
- Driver: 2nd coupled axle
- Gauge: 3 ft 6 in (1,067 mm) Cape gauge
- Leading dia.: 28 1/2 in (724 mm)
- Coupled dia.: 54 in (1,372 mm)
- Tender wheels: 33 1/2 in (851 mm) as built 34 in (864 mm) retyred
- Wheelbase: 46 ft 6 1/4 in (14,180 mm)
  - Axle spacing (Asymmetrical): 1–2: 4 ft 9 in (1,448 mm); 2–3: 6 ft 3 in (1,905 mm)
  - Engine: 20 ft 3 3/4 in (6,191 mm)
  - Leading: 5 ft 5 1/2 in (1,664 mm)
  - Coupled: 11 ft (3,353 mm)
  - Tender: 16 ft 1 in (4,902 mm)
  - Tender bogie: 4 ft 7 in (1,397 mm)
- Length
  - Over couplers: 53 ft 9 3/4 in (16,402 mm)
- Height: ♠ 12 ft 10 in (3,912 mm) ♥ 12 ft 10 3/8 in (3,921 mm)
- Frame type: Plate
- Axle load: ♠ 12 LT 3 cwt (12,340 kg) ♥ 13 LT 8 cwt (13,620 kg)
  - Leading: ♠ 11 LT 17 cwt (12,040 kg) ♥ 10 LT 17 cwt 2 qtr (11,050 kg)
  - Coupled: ♥ 13 LT 8 cwt (13,620 kg)
  - 1st coupled: ♠ 10 LT 7 cwt (10,520 kg)
  - 2nd coupled: ♠ 11 LT 18 cwt (12,090 kg)
  - 3rd coupled: ♠ 12 LT 3 cwt (12,340 kg)
  - Tender bogie: Bogie 1: 16 LT 12 cwt (16,870 kg); Bogie 2: 17 LT 13 cwt (17,930 kg)
  - Tender axle: 8 LT 16 cwt 2 qtr (8,967 kg)
- Adhesive weight: ♠ 34 LT 8 cwt (34,950 kg) ♥ 40 LT 4 cwt (40,850 kg)
- Loco weight: ♠ 46 LT 5 cwt (46,990 kg) ♥ 51 LT 1 cwt 2 qtr (51,890 kg)
- Tender weight: 34 LT 5 cwt (34,800 kg)
- Total weight: ♠ 80 LT 10 cwt (81,790 kg) ♥ 85 LT 6 cwt 2 qtr (86,690 kg)
- Tender type: XC1 (2-axle bogies); XC, XC1, XD, XE, XE1, XF, XF1, XF2, XJ, XM, XM1, XM2, XM3, XM4 permitted
- Fuel type: Coal
- Fuel capacity: 5 LT 10 cwt (5.6 t)
- Water cap.: 2,600 imp gal (11,820 L)
- Firebox
  - Type: ♠ Round-top – ♥ Belpaire
  - Grate area: ♠ 16.625 sq ft (1.5445 m^{2}) ♥ 16.6 sq ft (1.54 m^{2})
- Boiler
  - Pitch: ♠ 6 ft 8 in (2,032 mm) ♥ 7 ft (2,134 mm)
  - Diameter: ♠ 4 ft 4 in (1,321 mm) ♥ 4 ft 9 in (1,448 mm)
  - Tube plates: ♠♥ 11 ft 2 1/8 in (3,407 mm)
  - Small tubes: ♠ 185: 1 7/8 in (48 mm) ♥ 220: 2 in (51 mm)
- Boiler pressure: ♠ 160 psi (1,103 kPa) ♥ 180 psi (1,241 kPa)
- Safety valve: Ramsbottom
- Heating surface
  - Firebox: ♠ 101 sq ft (9.4 m^{2}) ♥ 111 sq ft (10.3 m^{2})
  - Tubes: ♠ 1,015 sq ft (94.3 m^{2}) ♥ 1,287.5 sq ft (119.61 m^{2})
  - Total surface: ♠ 1,116 sq ft (103.7 m^{2}) ♥ 1,398.5 sq ft (129.92 m^{2})
- Cylinders: Two
- Cylinder size: 17 in (432 mm) bore 26 in (660 mm) stroke
- Valve gear: Stephenson
- Couplers: Johnston link-and-pin AAR knuckle (1930s)
Performance figures
- Tractive effort: ♠ 16,690 lbf (74.2 kN) @ 75% ♥ 18,780 lbf (83.5 kN) @ 75%
Career
- Operators: Cape Government Railways; Imperial Military Railways; Benguela Railway; South African Railways; Sudan Railways
- Class: CGR 6th Class, SAR Class 6B
- Number in class: 51
- Numbers: CGR 202–233, 577–584, 587–593, 595–600, 663–664; IMR C502, C504–C508, C512; Benguela 22–25; SAR 490–540; Sudan M711-M712
- Delivered: 1897–1898
- First run: 1897
- Withdrawn: 1973
- Disposition: Four preserved (490, 496, 500, 536), remainder scrapped

The South African Railways Class 6B 4-6-0 of 1897 was a steam locomotive from the pre-Union era in the Cape of Good Hope.

In 1897 and 1898, the Cape Government Railways placed a third batch of 55 6th Class 4-6-0 steam locomotives in service, 32 on its Western System, 21 on its Midland System and two on its Eastern System. During the Second Boer War, seven were transferred to the Imperial Military Railways on loan, and in 1907 four were sold to the Benguela Railway in Angola. In 1912, when the remaining 51 locomotives were assimilated into the South African Railways, they were renumbered and designated Class 6B. During the Second World War, two of them were sold to the Sudan Railways.

== Manufacturers ==
The original 6th Class 4-6-0 passenger steam locomotive was designed at the Salt River works of the Cape Government Railways (CGR) at the same time as the 7th Class, both according to the specifications of Michael Stephens, then Chief Locomotive Superintendent of the CGR, and under the supervision of H.M. Beatty, then Locomotive Superintendent of the Cape Western System.

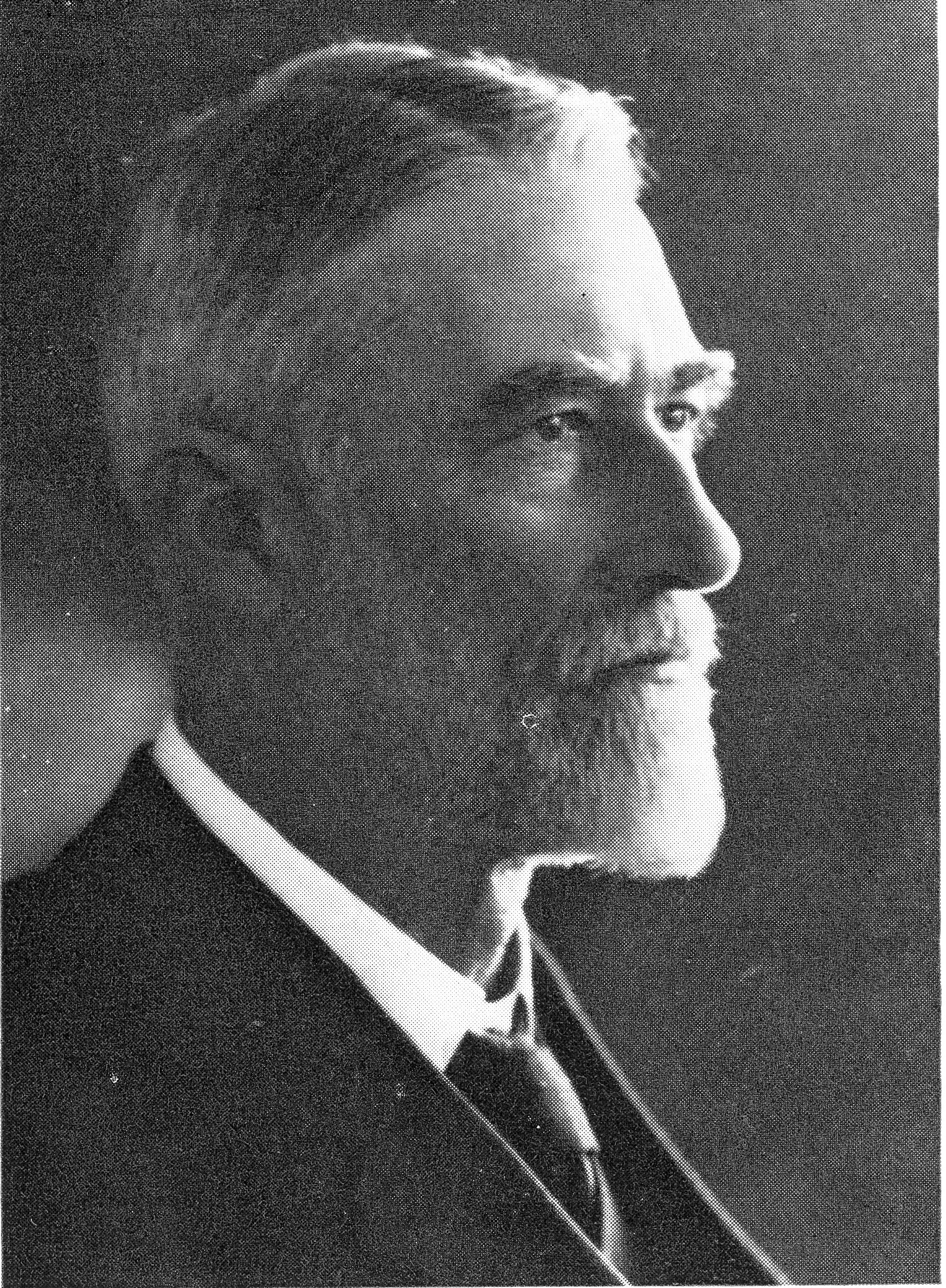
H.M. Beatty

The 55 locomotives in the third group were built between 1897 and 1898 by Dübs and Company and Neilson and Company. While they were being built, in 1898, the firm of Neilson and Company changed its name to Neilson, Reid and Company. Five of these locomotives were built by Dübs and of the remaining fifty, 37 were delivered as built by Neilson and the last thirteen as built by Neilson, Reid.

All five Dübs-built locomotives, numbered in the range from 577 to 581, and the thirteen Neilson, Reid-builts, numbered in the ranges from 587 to 593 and 595 to 600, went to the Midland System. Of the 37 Neilson-builts, 32 went to the Western System, numbered in the range from 202 to 233, three to the Midland System, numbered in the range from 582 to 584, and two to the Eastern System, numbered 663 and 664. Their respective works numbers and CGR engine numbers are tabled below.

These locomotives were, to all intents and purposes, identical to the previous fifty which became the Class 6A, except that they had four-axle Type XC1 tenders that rode on bogies instead of the three-axle Type YC tenders which were used with the earlier 6th Class locomotives.

== Class 6 sub-classes ==
When the Union of South Africa was established on 31 May 1910, the three Colonial government railways (CGR, Natal Government Railways and Central South African Railways) were united under a single administration to control and administer the railways, ports and harbours of the Union. Although the South African Railways and Harbours came into existence in 1910, the actual classification and renumbering of all the rolling stock of the three constituent railways were only implemented with effect from 1 January 1912.

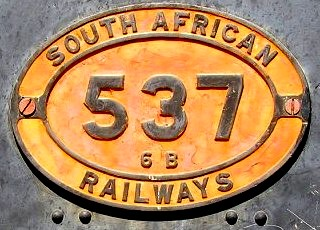

In 1912, all but four of these 55 locomotives were assimilated into the SAR, designated Class 6B and renumbered in the range from 490 to 540.

The rest of the CGR's 6th Class locomotives, together with those Classes 6-L1 to 6-L3 locomotives which were inherited by the Central South African Railways (CSAR) from the Oranje-Vrijstaat Gouwerment-Spoorwegen (OVGS) via the Imperial Military Railways (IMR), were grouped into thirteen more sub-classes by the SAR. The 4-6-0 locomotives became SAR Classes 6, 6A, 6C to 6H and 6J to 6L, the 2-6-2 locomotives became Class 6Y and the 2-6-4 locomotives became Class 6Z.

== Modifications ==
Several of the CSAR's Classes 6-L1 to 6-L3 locomotives had been modified by P.A Hyde, Chief Mechanical Engineer (CME) of the CSAR, by having their round-topped fireboxes replaced with larger Belpaire fireboxes and by having larger, more sheltered cabs installed. This conversion improved their performance tremendously and resulted in several of the Classes 6, 6A and 6B locomotives being similarly modified by the SAR in later years, but without altering their classifications.

During the 1930s, many of them were modified once again when the CME of the SAR at the time, A.G. Watson, reboilered them with round-topped fireboxes again, but retaining the larger cabs. Once again, they retained their classifications.

== Service ==
=== Imperial Military Railways ===
Seven of these locomotives saw service with the IMR during the Second Boer War, on loan from the CGR and temporarily renumbered for the duration of the war.

=== South African Railways ===
The 6th Class series of locomotives were introduced primarily as passenger locomotives, but when the class became displaced by larger and more powerful locomotive classes, it literally became a Jack-of-all-trades which proved itself as one of the most useful and successful locomotive classes ever to be designed at the Salt River shops. It went on to see service in all parts of the country, except Natal, and on all types of traffic.

=== Benguela Railway ===
In 1907, four of these locomotives were sold to the Benguela Railway (Caminho de Ferro de Benguela – CFB) in Angola. These, therefore, did not see SAR service. In the mid-1930s, to ease maintenance, modifications were made to the running boards and brake gear of the CFB locomotives. The former involved mounting the running boards higher, thereby getting rid of the coupled wheel fairings. This gave the locomotives a much more American rather than British appearance.

=== Sudan Railways ===
During the Second World War, sixteen of the Classes 6 to 6D were transferred to the Middle East to assist with the war effort during the North African Campaign. The two Class 6B locomotives in this group were numbers 534 and 538. They were sold to the Sudan Railways Corporation in 1942 and renumbered M711 and M712, in the same order as their former SAR engine numbers.

== Renumberings ==
During their long service lives, some of the Class 6A locomotives underwent multiple renumbering. All were initially numbered into the CGR's three systems, in the number ranges from 202 to 233 on the Western System, 577 to 584, 587 to 593 and 595 to 600 on the Midland System, and 663 and 664 on the Eastern System. The seven locomotives which were loaned to the IMR were renumbered C502, C504 to C508 and C512 for the duration of their military service, while the four sold to Angola became the Benguela Railway's numbers 22 to 25.

On the four Benguela locomotives, sources are inconclusive about their renumbering sequence in respect of which particular CGR locomotive became which particular CFB locomotive. The numbers as listed were arrived at by a process of elimination.

In 1912, the remaining 51 locomotives were renumbered in the number range from 490 to 540 on the SAR. The table lists their renumbering, as well as their builders and works numbers.

Class 6B 4-6-0 Builders, works numbers and renumbering
Builder	Year built	Works no.	CGR no.	IMR no.	CFB no.	SAR no.	Sudan no.
Neilson	1897	5120	202			490	
Neilson	1897	5121	203			491	
Neilson	1897	5122	204			492	
Neilson	1897	5123	205			493	
Neilson	1897	5124	206			494	
Neilson	1897	5125	207			495	
Neilson	1897	5128	208	C504		496	
Neilson	1897	5129	209			497	
Neilson	1897–98	5131	210			498	
Neilson	1897–98	5132	211			499	
Neilson	1897–98	5133	212			500	
Neilson	1897–98	5134	213			501	
Neilson	1897–98	5135	214	C507		502	
Neilson	1897–98	5136	215			503	
Neilson	1897–98	5137	216			504	
Neilson	1897–98	5138	217			505	
Neilson	1897–98	5139	218		22		
Neilson	1897–98	5140	219			506	
Neilson	1897–98	5141	220			507	
Neilson	1897–98	5142	221			508	
Neilson	1897–98	5143	222	C508		509	
Neilson	1897–98	5144	223		23		
Neilson	1897–98	5145	224	C506		510	
Neilson	1898	5148	225	C512		511	
Neilson	1898	5149	226			512	
Neilson	1898	5150	227			513	
Neilson	1898	5151	228			514	
Neilson	1898	5152	229	C502		515	
Neilson	1898	5153	230	C505		516	
Neilson	1898	5154	231			517	
Neilson	1898	5155	232			518	
Neilson	1898	5156	233			519	
Dübs	1897	3467	577			520	
Dübs	1897	3468	578			521	
Dübs	1897	3472	579			522	
Dübs	1897	3473	580			523	
Dübs	1897	3474	581			524	
Neilson	1898	5157	582			525	
Neilson	1898	5158	583			526	
Neilson	1898	5159	584			527	
Neilson Reid	1898	5273	587			528	
Neilson Reid	1898	5274	588		24		
Neilson Reid	1898	5275	589			529	
Neilson Reid	1898	5276	590			530	
Neilson Reid	1898	5277	591			531	
Neilson Reid	1898	5278	592			532	
Neilson Reid	1898	5279	593			533	
Neilson Reid	1898	5319	595			534	M711
Neilson Reid	1898	5320	596			535	
Neilson Reid	1898	5321	597			536	
Neilson Reid	1898	5322	598			537	
Neilson Reid	1898	5323	599			538	M712
Neilson Reid	1898	5324	600		25		
Neilson	1898	5146	663			539	
Neilson	1898	5147	664			540	

== Preservation ==
Four Class 6B locomotives are plinthed around South Africa.

- No. 490 is on display at the Old Railway Station Museum in Uitenhage.
- No. 498 is on display at Fort Klapperkop Museum in Pretoria.
- No. 500 is plinthed at the Vereeniging Station forecourt.
- No. 536 is on display near the entrance to the caravan park in Barberton.

== Illustration ==
The main picture shows Neilson-built ex Western System 6th Class no. 206, later renumbered to SAR Class 6B no. 494 and reboilered with a Belpaire firebox, on the old Cape Town turntable. The locomotives in the following pictures all have round-topped fireboxes.

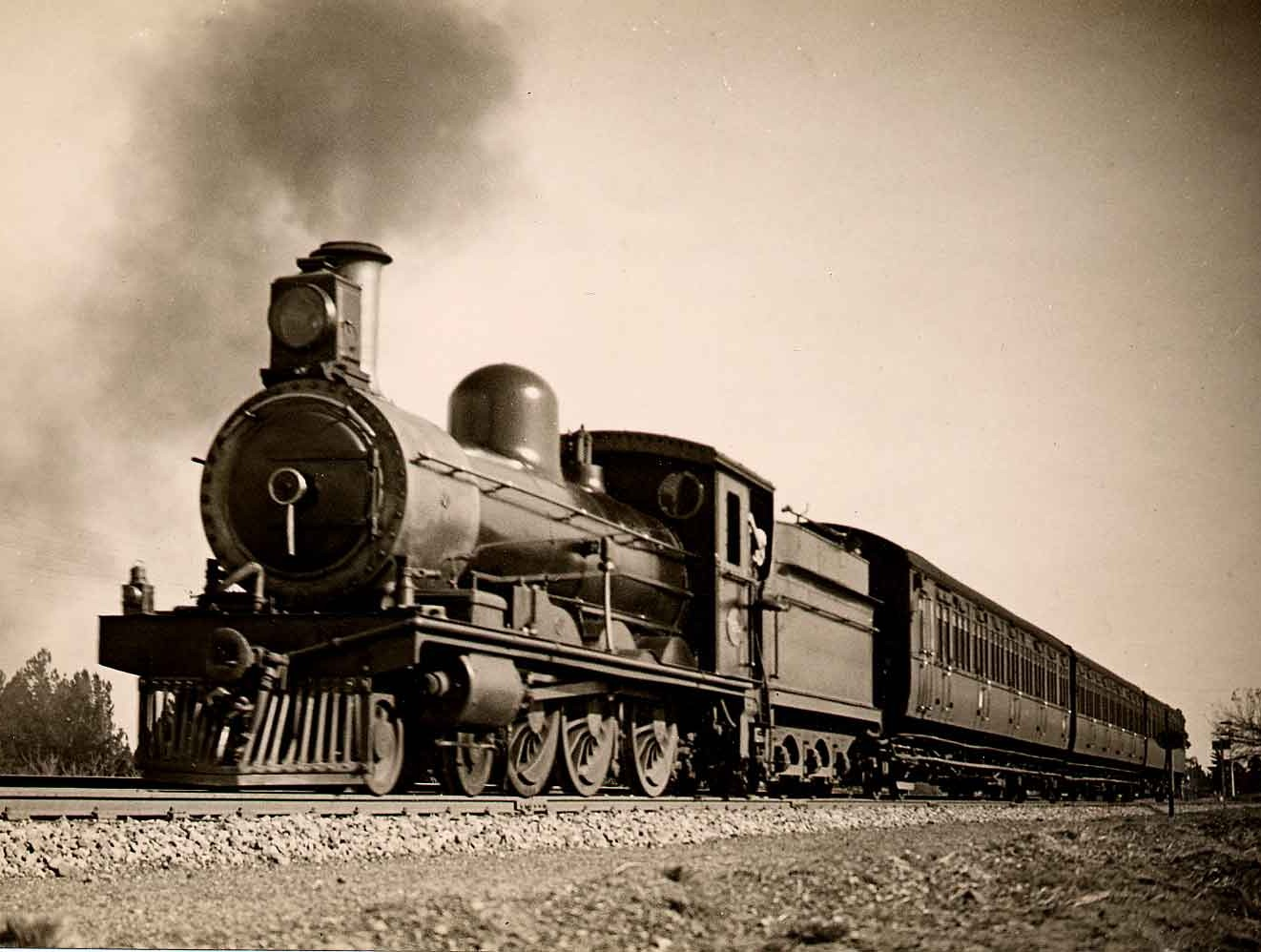
Class 6B approaching Dallas from Wattles, Transvaal, c. 1934

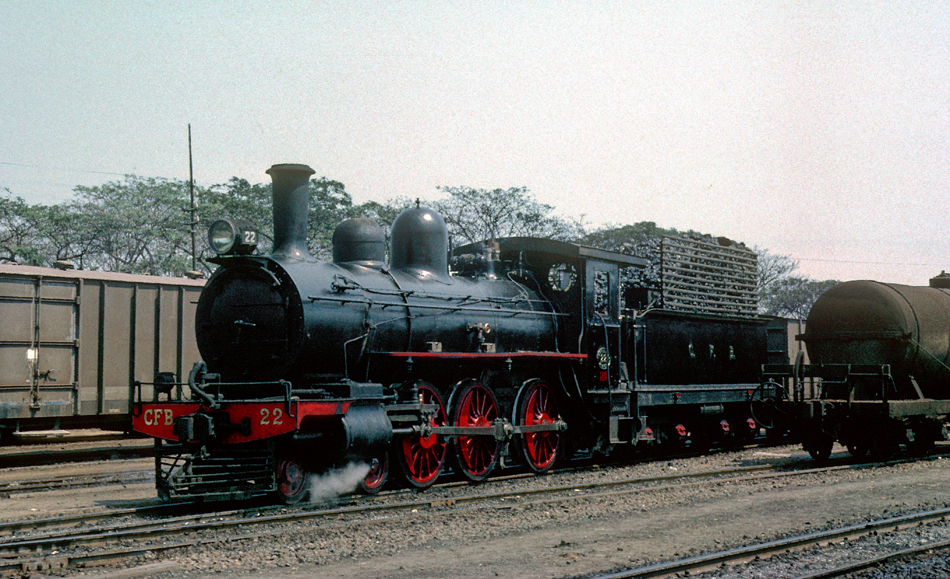
Ex CGR 6th Class no. 218, CFB no. 22, at Benguela, Angola, on 12 August 1972

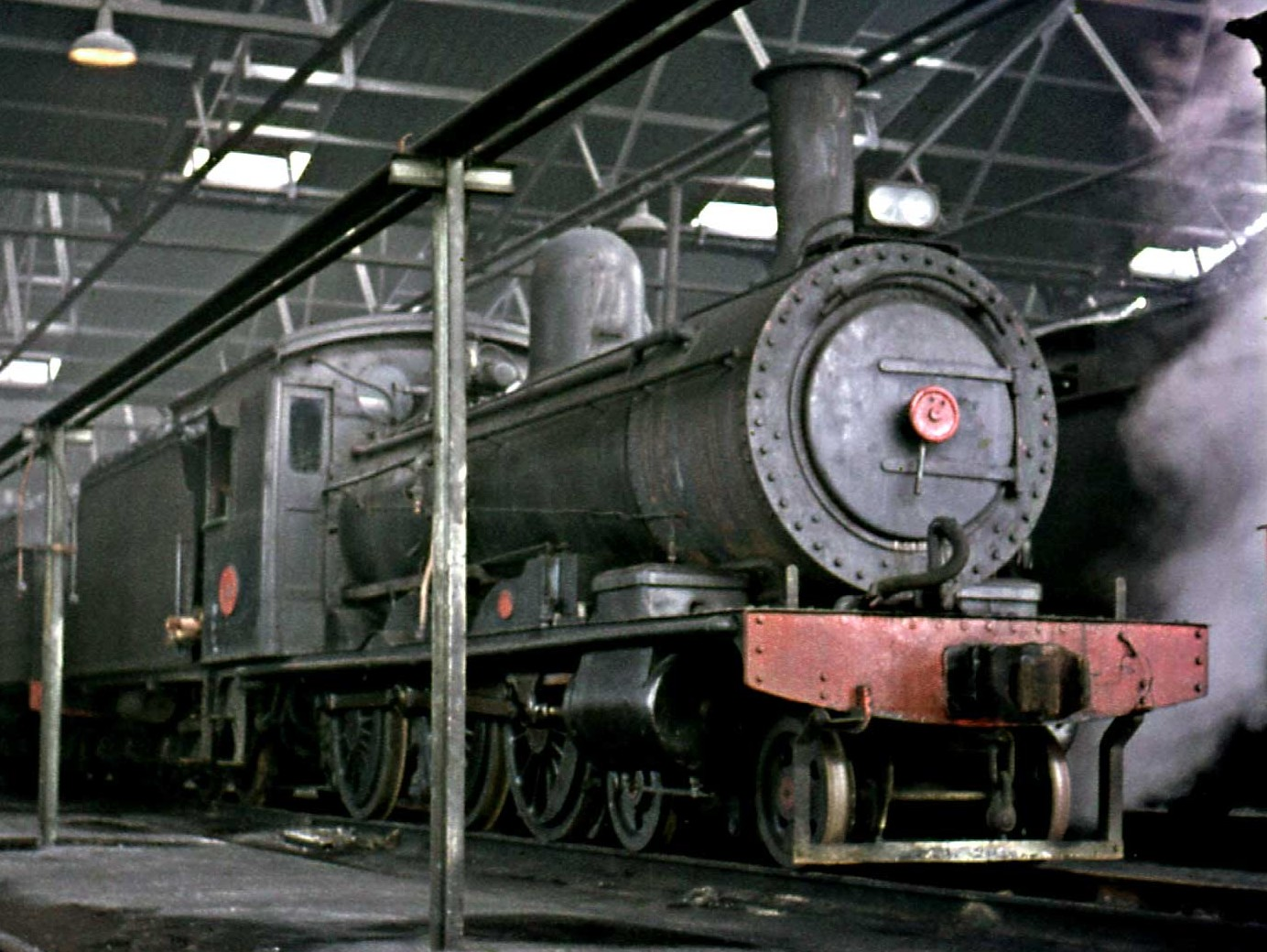
Class 6B with round-topped firebox, large cab and Type XE tender, Paardeneiland, c. 1970

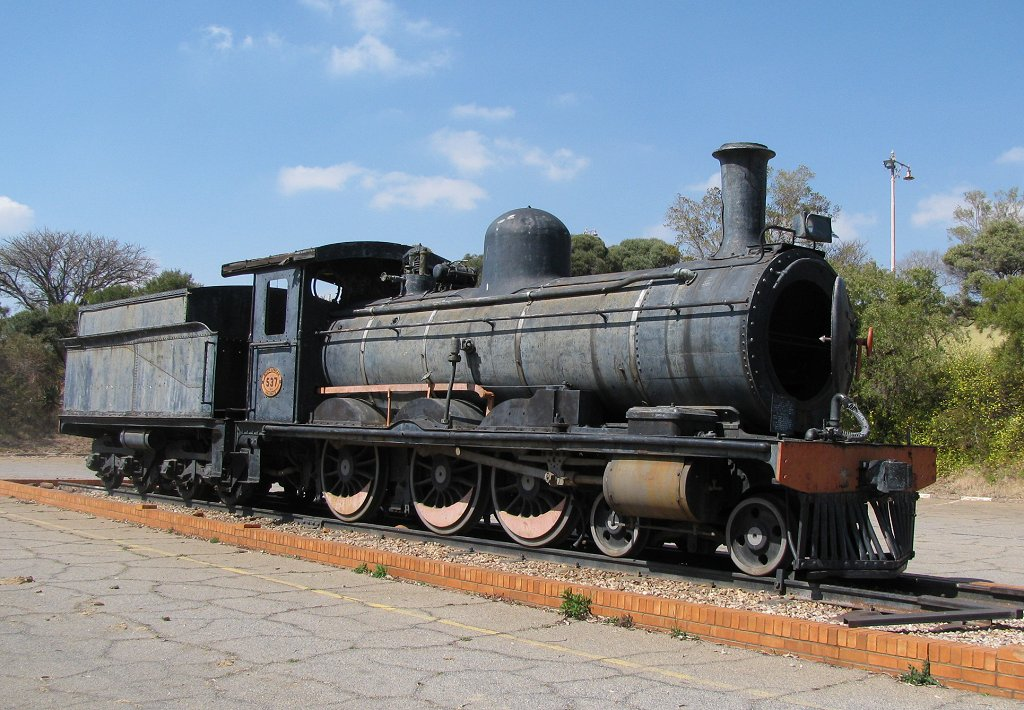
CGR 6th Class no. 598, SAR Class 6B no. 537, Fort Klapperkop, 16 August 2009
