= South African Class 8B 4-8-0 =

1903 design of steam locomotive

CSAR Class 8-L2 4-8-0 South African Classes 8B & 8BW 4-8-0
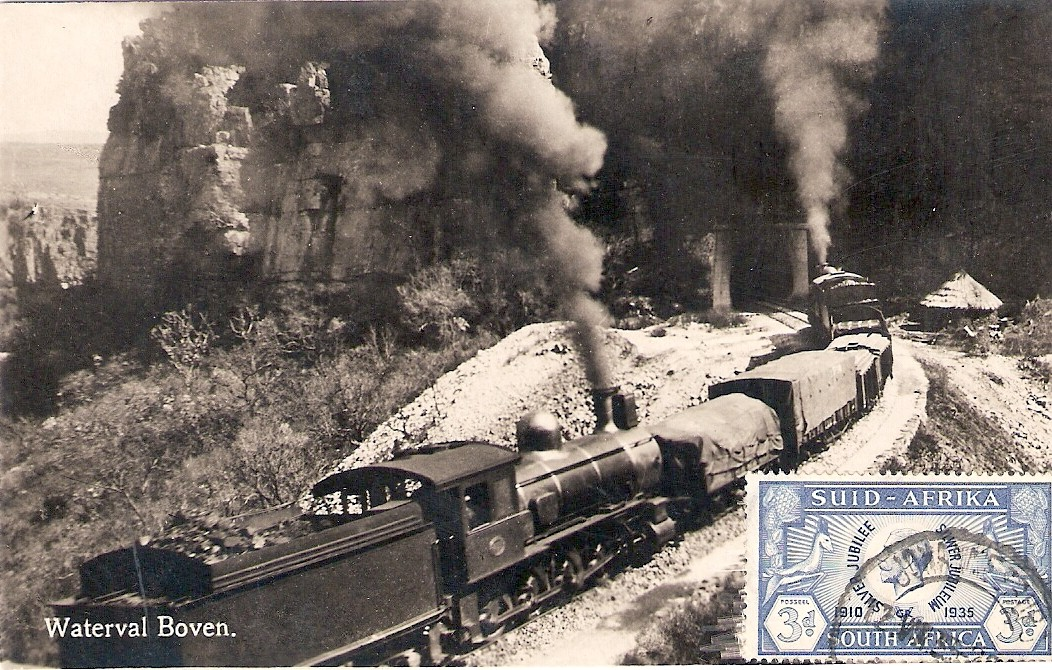
- CSAR Class 8-L2, SAR Class 8B, at the Waterval Boven tunnel, c. 1912
Type and origin
- ♠ Original locomotive, as built ♥ Superheated, outside admission valves ♣ Superheated, inside admission valves, Class 8BW
- Power type: Steam
- Designer: Cape Government Railways (H.M. Beatty)
- Builder: Neilson, Reid and Company; North British Locomotive Company
- Serial number: Neilson, Reid 6351-6360; NBL 15783-15802
- Model: CGR 8th Class (4-8-0)
- Build date: 1903
- Total produced: 30
Specifications
- Configuration
  - Whyte: 4-8-0 (Mastodon)
  - UIC: ♠ 2'Dn2 – ♥♣ 2'Dh2
- Driver: 2nd coupled axle
- Gauge: 3 ft 6 in (1,067 mm) Cape gauge
- Leading dia.: 28 1/2 in (724 mm)
- Coupled dia.: 48 in (1,219 mm)
- Tender wheels: 33 1/2 in (851 mm) as built 34 in (864 mm) retyred
- Wheelbase: 46 ft 10 1/2 in (14,288 mm)
  - Engine: 23 ft 3 in (7,087 mm)
  - Leading: 6 ft (1,829 mm)
  - Coupled: 13 ft 6 in (4,115 mm)
  - Tender: 14 ft 7 in (4,445 mm)
  - Tender bogie: 4 ft 7 in (1,397 mm)
- Length
  - Over couplers: 54 ft 5 in (16,586 mm)
- Height: ♠ 12 ft 10 in (3,912 mm) ♥♣ 12 ft 8 in (3,861 mm)
- Frame type: Bar
- Axle load: ♠ 12 LT 10 cwt (12,700 kg) ♥ 12 LT (12,190 kg) ♣ 12 LT 11 cwt (12,750 kg)
  - Leading: ♠ 11 LT 18 cwt (12,090 kg) ♥♣ 12 LT 15 cwt (12,950 kg)
  - Coupled: ♥ 12 LT (12,190 kg)
  - 1st coupled: ♠ 12 LT 9 cwt (12,650 kg) ♣ 11 LT 18 cwt (12,090 kg)
  - 2nd coupled: ♠ 12 LT 10 cwt (12,700 kg) ♣ 12 LT 11 cwt (12,750 kg)
  - 3rd coupled: ♠ 11 LT 19 cwt (12,140 kg) ♣ 11 LT 19 cwt (12,140 kg)
  - 4th coupled: ♠ 11 LT 16 cwt (11,990 kg) ♣ 11 LT 18 cwt (12,090 kg)
  - Tender bogie: Bogie 1: 18 LT 4 cwt (18,490 kg); Bogie 2: 19 LT 8 cwt (19,710 kg)
  - Tender axle: 9 LT 14 cwt (9,856 kg)
- Adhesive weight: ♠ 48 LT 14 cwt (49,480 kg) ♥ 48 LT (48,770 kg) ♣ 48 LT 6 cwt (49,080 kg)
- Loco weight: ♠ 60 LT 12 cwt (61,570 kg) ♥ 60 LT 15 cwt (61,720 kg) ♣ 61 LT 1 cwt (62,030 kg)
- Tender weight: 37 LT 12 cwt (38,200 kg)
- Total weight: ♠ 98 LT 4 cwt (99,780 kg) ♥ 98 LT 7 cwt (99,930 kg) ♣ 98 LT 13 cwt (100,200 kg)
- Tender type: XF (2-axle bogies); XC, XC1, XD, XE, XE1, XF, XF1, XF2, XJ, XM, XM1, XM2, XM3 permitted
- Fuel type: Coal
- Fuel capacity: 6 LT (6.1 t)
- Water cap.: 3,000 imp gal (13,600 L)
- Firebox
  - Type: Round-top, Drummond
  - Grate area: 21 sq ft (2.0 m^{2})
- Boiler
  - Pitch: ♠ 7 ft (2,134 mm) ♥♣ 7 ft 1 in (2,159 mm)
  - Diameter: ♠♥♣ 5 ft (1,524 mm)
  - Tube plates: ♠ 11 ft 1/2 in (3,366 mm) ♥♣ 11 ft 3/8 in (3,362 mm)
  - Small tubes: ♠ 197: 2 in (51 mm) ♥♣ 115: 2 in (51 mm)
  - Large tubes: ♠ 48 Drummond: 2 1/2 in (64 mm) ♥♣ 18: 5 1/2 in (140 mm)
- Boiler pressure: 180 psi (1,241 kPa)
- Safety valve: Ramsbottom
- Heating surface
  - Firebox: ♠ 125.4 sq ft (11.65 m^{2}) ♥♣ 131 sq ft (12.2 m^{2})
  - Tubes: ♠ 1,261.9 sq ft (117.23 m^{2}) ♥♣ 950 sq ft (88 m^{2})
  - Total surface: ♠ 1,387.3 sq ft (128.88 m^{2}) ♥♣ 1,081 sq ft (100.4 m^{2})
- Superheater
  - Heating area: ♥♣ 214 sq ft (19.9 m^{2})
- Cylinders: Two
- Cylinder size: ♠ 18 1/2 in (470 mm) bore ♥ 19 in (483 mm) bore ♣ 20 in (508 mm) bore ♠♥♣ 24 in (610 mm) stroke
- Valve gear: Stephenson
- Valve type: ♠ Slide – ♥♣ Piston
- Couplers: Johnston link-and-pin AAR knuckle (1930s)
Performance figures
- Tractive effort: ♠ 23,110 lbf (102.8 kN) @ 75% ♥ 24,370 lbf (108.4 kN) @ 75% ♣ 27,000 lbf (120 kN) @ 75%
Career
- Operators: Central South African Railways; South African Railways
- Class: CSAR Class 8-L2; SAR Class 8B, Class 8BW
- Number in class: 30
- Numbers: CSAR 441-470, SAR 1132-1161
- Delivered: 1903
- First run: 1903
- Withdrawn: 1972
- The leading coupled axle had flangeless wheels

The South African Railways Class 8B 4-8-0 of 1903 was a steam locomotive from the pre-Union era in Transvaal Colony.

In 1903, soon after its establishment, the Central South African Railways placed thirty Class 8-L2 4-8-0 Mastodon type steam locomotives in service. In 1912, when they were assimilated into the South African Railways, they were renumbered and designated Class 8B.

== Central South African Railways ==
Upon the establishment of the Central South African Railways (CSAR) in July 1902, a month after the end of the Second Boer War, Chief Locomotive Superintendent P.A. Hyde became the custodian of a mixed bag of locomotives inherited from the Imperial Military Railways (IMR). Apart from those locomotives which had been acquired new by the IMR during the war, these included engines which originated with the Selati Railway, the Nederlandsche Zuid-Afrikaansche Spoorweg-Maatschappij (NZASM), the Pretoria-Pietersburg Railway (PPR) and the Oranje-Vrijstaat Gouwerment-Spoorwegen (OVGS).

== Manufacturers ==
The comparatively small number of serviceable locomotives which were immediately available for service, compounded by the poor condition of many of the original NZASM, PPR, Selati and OVGS locomotives as well as an expected post-war increase in traffic, led to an order for thirty Cape 8th Class 4-8-0 steam locomotives from Neilson, Reid and Company.

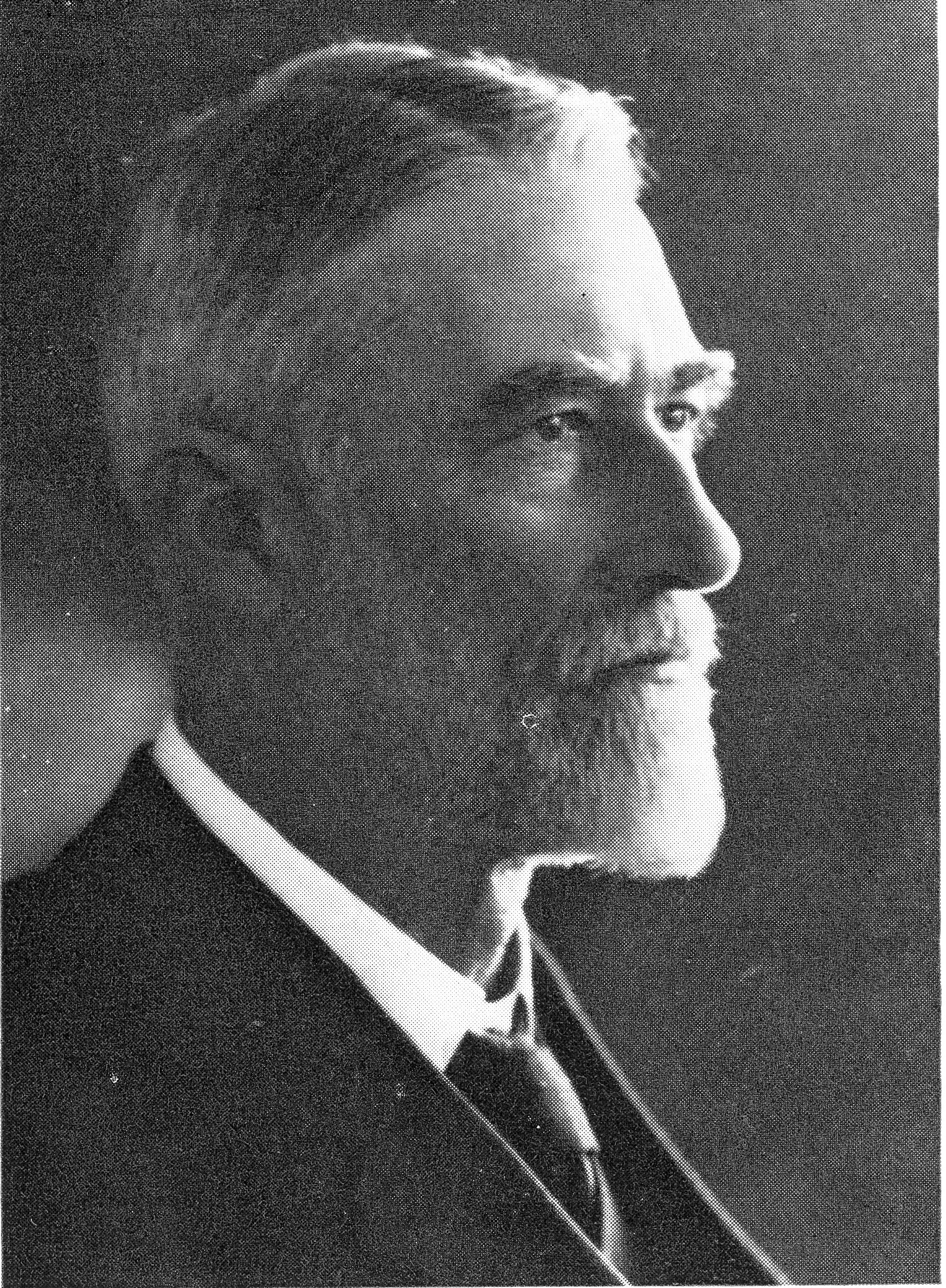
H.M. Beatty

They were built to the specifications of the 8th Class 4-8-0 Mastodon type designed by H.M. Beatty, the Chief Locomotive Superintendent of the Cape Government Railways (CGR) from 1896 to 1910, and were the first locomotives to be ordered under the CSAR administration. Since they differed from the Class 8-L1 which had been inherited from the IMR by being equipped with Drummond tubes, these locomotives were designated CSAR Class 8-L2.

While they were being built, Neilson, Reid amalgamated with Dübs and Company and Sharp, Stewart and Company to form the North British Locomotive Company (NBL). As a result, the first ten of these locomotives, numbered in the range from 441 to 450, were delivered as built by Neilson, Reid, while the other twenty, numbered in the range from 451 to 470, were delivered as built by NBL, even though all the NBL locomotives were also built at the Hyde Park shops of the former Neilson, Reid.

== Drummond tubes ==
When Hyde placed the order for these locomotives, he specified fireboxes equipped with Drummond water tubes. This involved the installation of crossing water tubes into the firebox, as featured on the London and South Western Railway's T9 Class and L11 Class, in an attempt to increase the heating surface area of the water, albeit at the cost of increased boiler complexity. The tubes were arranged in two clusters and angled to aid circulation. Visible exterior evidence of the presence of Drummond tubes was the two offset rectangular inspection covers attached to the sides of the firebox. They contained stay plugs, serving stays which extended through the tubes from cover to cover through the firebox.

The CGR had also experimented with Drummond tubes by modifying its 6th Class no. 286 and had found that the benefit in improved performance was minimal, while the tubes were inclined to leak and were difficult to maintain. Like the CGR, the CSAR soon learned that the increase in steaming capacity was not sufficient to warrant the additional initial cost and increased maintenance requirements.

Apart from the Drummond tubes, the locomotives differed from the Class 8-L1 in a few particulars. Their coupling rods were "H" section instead of rectangular, while their crank pins were slightly larger.

== South African Railways ==
When the Union of South Africa was established on 31 May 1910, the three Colonial government railways (CGR, Natal Government Railways and CSAR) were united under a single administration to control and administer the railways, ports and harbours of the Union. Although the South African Railways and Harbours came into existence in 1910, the actual classification and renumbering of all the rolling stock of the three constituent railways were only implemented with effect from 1 January 1912.

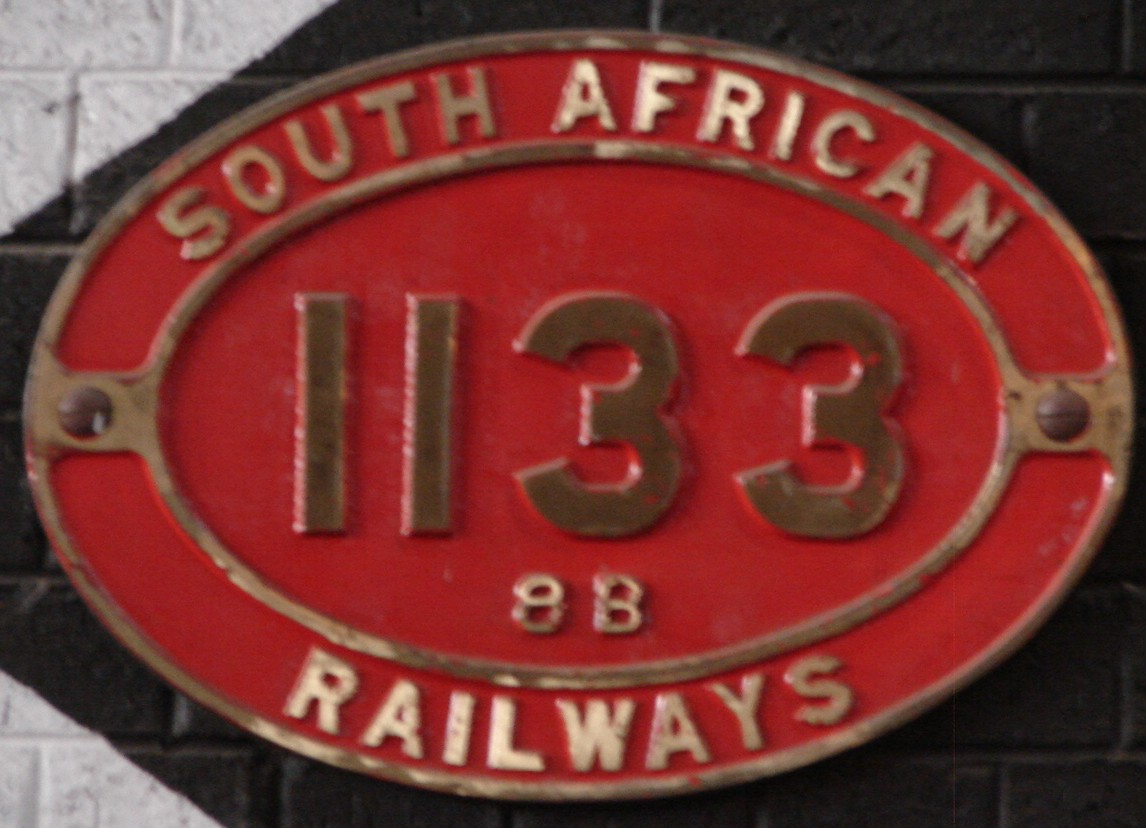

In 1912, these locomotives were renumbered in the range from 1132 to 1161 and designated Class 8B on the SAR.

The Class 8-L2 locomotives, together with the CSAR's Classes 8-L1 and 8-L3 4-8-0 Mastodon type locomotives and all the CGR's 8th Class 2-8-0 Consolidations and 4-8-0 Mastodons were grouped into ten different sub-classes by the SAR. The 4-8-0 locomotives became SAR Classes 8 and 8A to 8F and the 2-8-0 locomotives became Classes 8X to 8Z.

== Modifications ==
In the SAR era, the Drummond tubes were gradually removed as and when the boilers required repairs, but the locomotives retained their Class 8B designation.

During A.G. Watson's term as the Chief Mechanical Engineer (CME) of the SAR from 1929 to 1936, many of the Class 8 to Class 8F locomotives were equipped with superheated boilers, larger bore cylinders and either inside or outside admission piston valves.

The outside admission valve locomotives had their cylinder bore increased from 18 1/2 inches (470 millimetres) to 19 inches (483 millimetres) and retained their existing SAR classifications, while the inside admission valve locomotives had their cylinder bore increased to 20 inches (508 millimetres) and were reclassified, with a "W" suffix added to their existing SAR classifications.

Of the Class 8B locomotives, nine were equipped with superheating, 19 inches (483 millimetres) bore cylinders and outside admission piston valves, while retaining their Class 8B classification.

Six locomotives were equipped with superheating, 20 inches (508 millimetres) bore cylinders and inside admission piston valves and were reclassified to Class 8BW.

== Service ==
In SAR service, the 4-8-0 Class 8 family of locomotives served on every system in the country and, in the 1920s, became the mainstay of motive power on many branch lines. Their final days were spent in shunting service. They were all withdrawn from service by 1972.

== Works numbers ==
The Class 8B and 8BW builders, works numbers, renumbering and superheating modifications are listed in the table.

Class 8B & 8BW – Builders, works numbers, renumbering and modification
Builder	Works No.	CSAR No.	SAR No.	SAR Model
Neilson Reid	6351	441	1132	Superheated
Neilson Reid	6352	442	1133	
Neilson Reid	6353	443	1134	Class 8BW
Neilson Reid	6354	444	1135	Class 8BW
Neilson Reid	6355	445	1136	Class 8BW
Neilson Reid	6356	446	1137	Superheated
Neilson Reid	6357	447	1138	
Neilson Reid	6358	448	1139	Superheated
Neilson Reid	6359	449	1140	
Neilson Reid	6360	450	1141	
NBL	15783	451	1142	Class 8BW
NBL	15784	452	1143	
NBL	15785	453	1144	Class 8BW
NBL	15786	454	1145	
NBL	15787	455	1146	Superheated
NBL	15788	456	1147	
NBL	15789	457	1148	
NBL	15790	458	1149	
NBL	15791	459	1150	
NBL	15792	460	1151	Superheated
NBL	15793	461	1152	Superheated
NBL	15794	462	1153	Class 8BW
NBL	15795	463	1154	Superheated
NBL	15796	464	1155	Superheated
NBL	15797	465	1156	
NBL	15798	466	1157	
NBL	15799	467	1158	Superheated
NBL	15800	468	1159	
NBL	15801	469	1160	
NBL	15802	470	1161	

== Illustration ==
The main picture is a scan of a c. 1935 post card, showing a SAR Class 8B, ex CSAR Class 8-L2, banking at the Waterval Boven tunnel. The pictures below illustrate unmodified locomotives with Drummond tubes as well as superheated locomotives with outside admission piston valves (no. 1155) and inside admission piston valves (no. 1153).

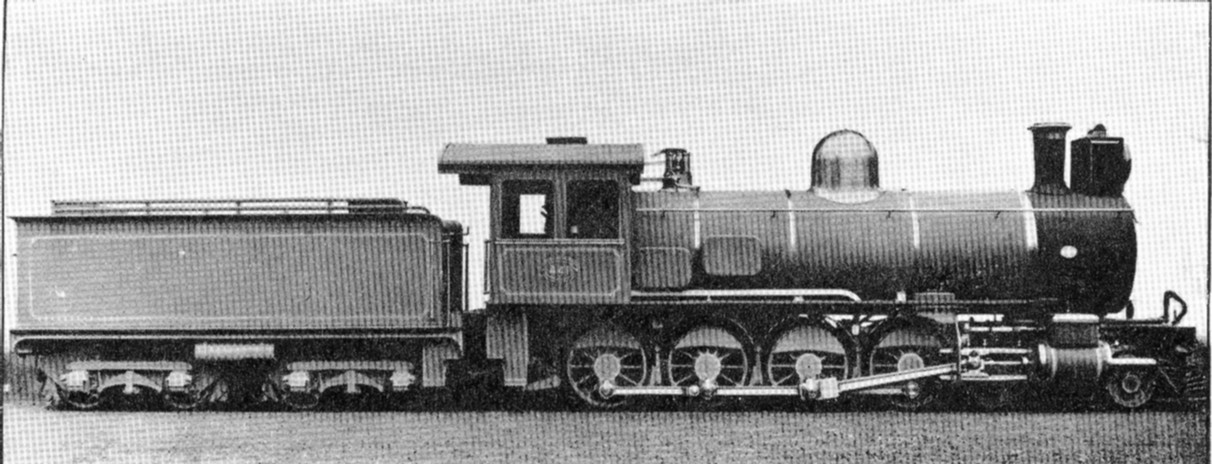
CSAR no. 441 works picture, with Drummond tubes, SAR no. 1132, c. 1903

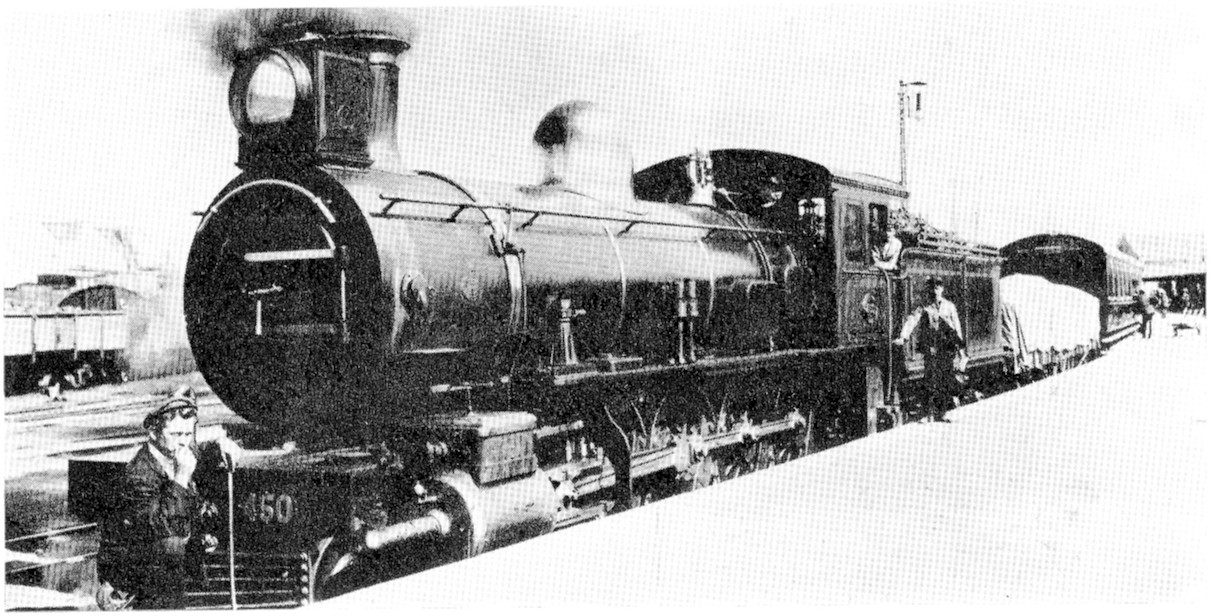
CSAR no. 450 with Drummond tubes, SAR no. 1141, c. 1910

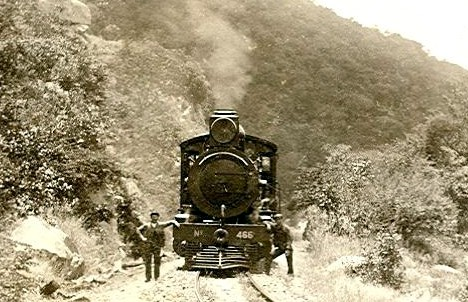
CSAR no. 466, SAR no. 1157, Barberton line, c. 1910

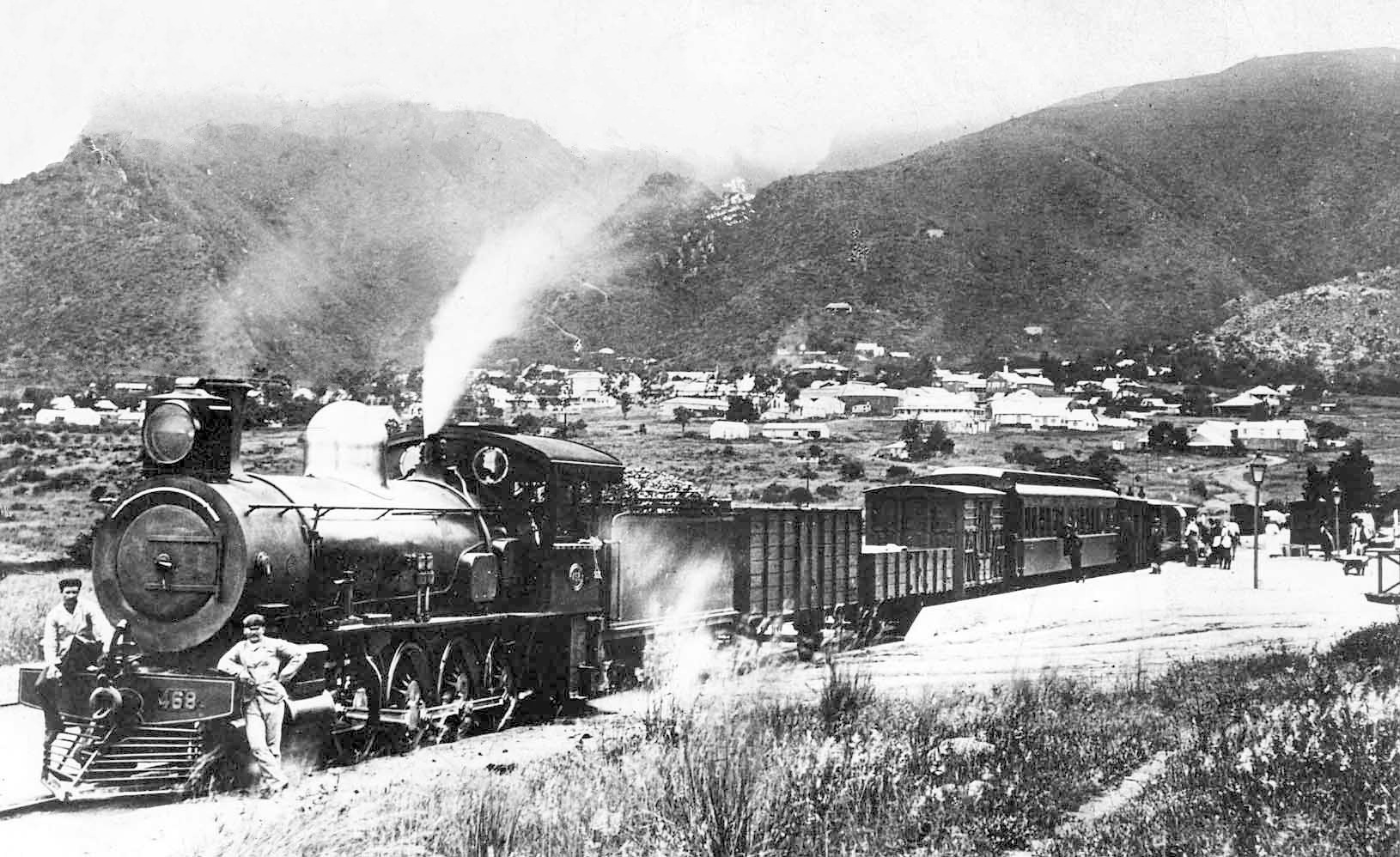
CSAR no. 468 with Drummond tubes, SAR no. 1159, Barberton, c. 1910

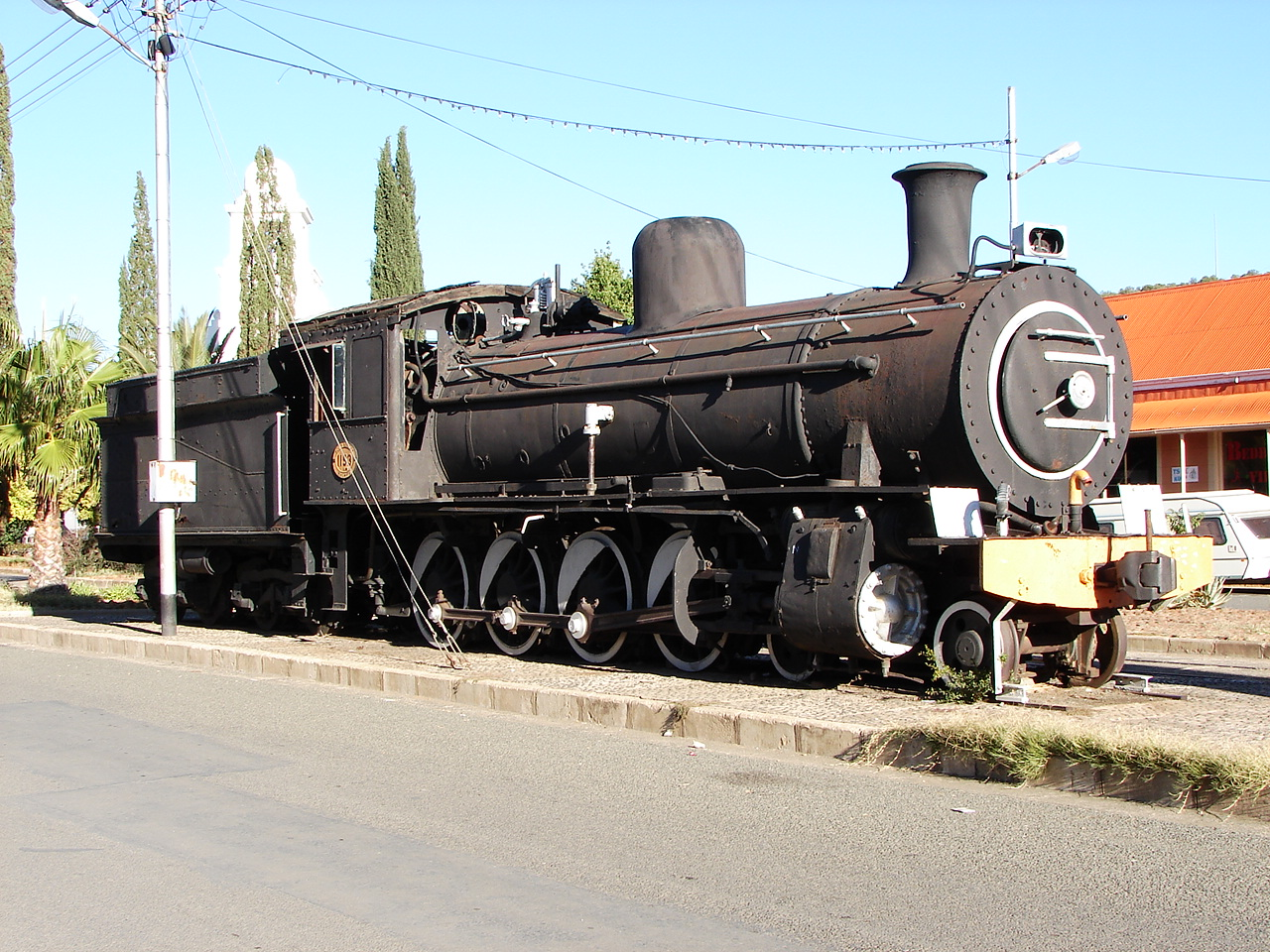
No. 1153 with inside admission piston valves, Fauresmith, 28 April 2013

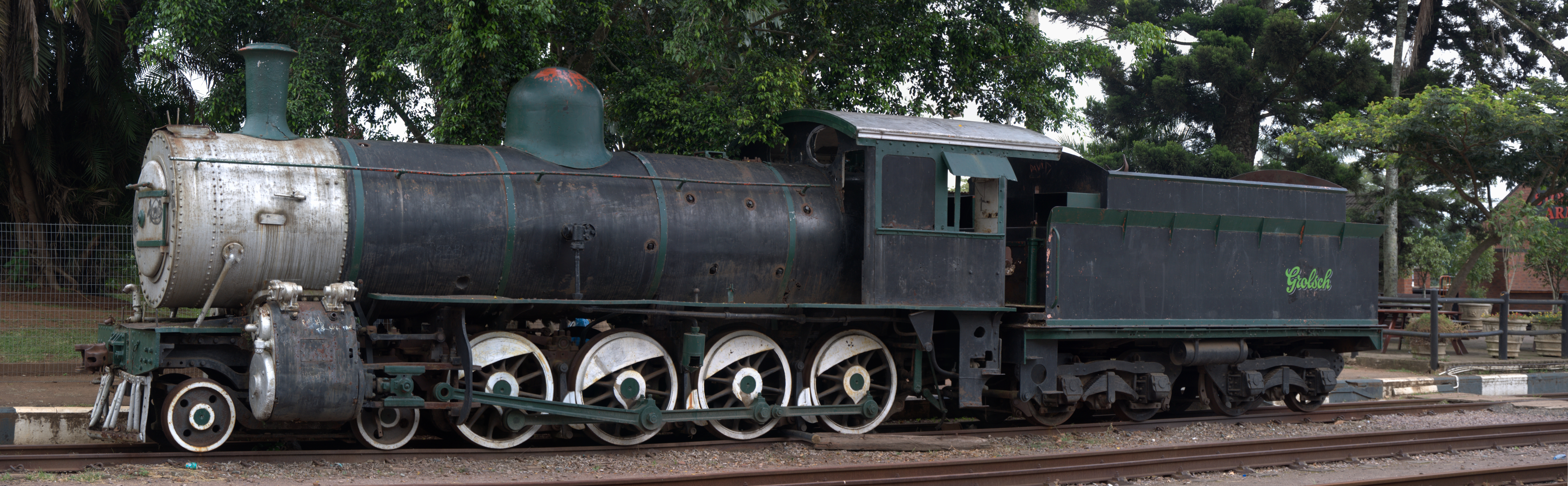
No. 1155 with outside admission piston valves, Kloof Station, KwaZulu-Natal, 9 February 2011
