= South African Class 8C 4-8-0 =

1903 design of steam locomotive

CSAR Class 8-L3 4-8-0 South African Classes 8C & 8CW 4-8-0
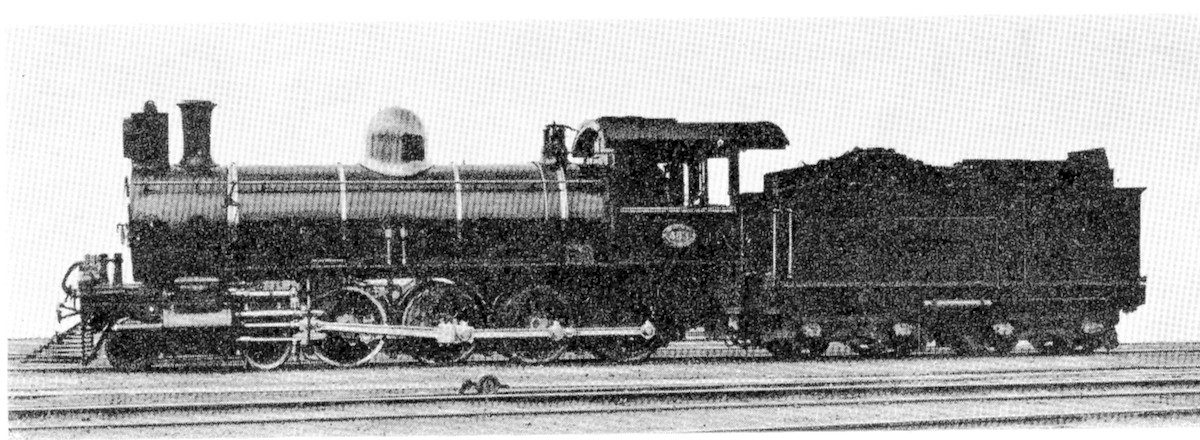
- CSAR Class 8-L3 483, SAR Class 8C 1174, c. 1910
Type and origin
- ♠ Original locomotive, as built ♥ Superheated, outside admission valves ♣ Superheated, inside admission valves, Class 8CW
- Power type: Steam
- Designer: Cape Government Railways (H.M. Beatty)
- Builder: North British Locomotive Company
- Serial number: 15803-15832
- Model: CGR 8th Class (4-8-0)
- Build date: 1903
- Total produced: 30
Specifications
- Configuration
  - Whyte: 4-8-0 (Mastodon)
  - UIC: ♠ 2'Dn2 – ♥♣ 2'Dh2
- Driver: 2nd coupled axle
- Gauge: 3 ft 6 in (1,067 mm) Cape gauge
- Leading dia.: 28 1/2 in (724 mm)
- Coupled dia.: 48 in (1,219 mm)
- Tender wheels: 33 1/2 in (851 mm) as built 34 in (864 mm) retyred
- Wheelbase: 46 ft 10 1/2 in (14,288 mm)
  - Engine: 23 ft 3 in (7,087 mm)
  - Leading: 6 ft (1,829 mm)
  - Coupled: 13 ft 6 in (4,115 mm)
  - Tender: 14 ft 7 in (4,445 mm)
  - Tender bogie: 4 ft 7 in (1,397 mm)
- Length
  - Over couplers: 54 ft 5 in (16,586 mm)
- Height: ♠ 12 ft 10 in (3,912 mm) ♥♣ 12 ft 8 in (3,861 mm)
- Frame type: Bar
- Axle load: ♠ 11 LT 17 cwt (12,040 kg) ♥ 12 LT (12,190 kg) ♣ 12 LT 11 cwt (12,750 kg)
  - Leading: ♠ 12 LT 5 cwt (12,450 kg) ♥♣ 12 LT 15 cwt (12,950 kg)
  - Coupled: ♥ 12 LT (12,190 kg)
  - 1st coupled: ♠ 11 LT 11 cwt (11,740 kg) ♣ 11 LT 18 cwt (12,090 kg)
  - 2nd coupled: ♠ 11 LT 17 cwt (12,040 kg) ♣ 12 LT 11 cwt (12,750 kg)
  - 3rd coupled: ♠ 11 LT 11 cwt (11,740 kg) ♣ 11 LT 19 cwt (12,140 kg)
  - 4th coupled: ♠ 11 LT 13 cwt (11,840 kg) ♣ 11 LT 18 cwt (12,090 kg)
  - Tender bogie: Bogie 1: 18 LT 4 cwt (18,490 kg); Bogie 2: 19 LT 8 cwt (19,710 kg)
  - Tender axle: 9 LT 14 cwt (9,856 kg)
- Adhesive weight: ♠ 46 LT 12 cwt (47,350 kg) ♥ 48 LT (48,770 kg) ♣ 48 LT 6 cwt (49,080 kg)
- Loco weight: ♠ 58 LT 17 cwt (59,790 kg) ♥ 60 LT 15 cwt (61,720 kg) ♣ 61 LT 1 cwt (62,030 kg)
- Tender weight: 37 LT 12 cwt (38,200 kg)
- Total weight: ♠ 96 LT 9 cwt (98,000 kg) ♥ 98 LT 7 cwt (99,930 kg) ♣ 98 LT 13 cwt (100,200 kg)
- Tender type: XF (2-axle bogies); XC, XC1, XD, XE, XE1, XF, XF1, XF2, XJ, XM, XM1, XM2, XM3 permitted
- Fuel type: Coal
- Fuel capacity: 6 LT (6.1 t)
- Water cap.: 3,000 imp gal (13,600 L)
- Firebox
  - Type: Round-top
  - Grate area: ♠♥♣ 21 sq ft (2.0 m^{2})
- Boiler
  - Pitch: ♠ 7 ft (2,134 mm) ♥♣ 7 ft 1 in (2,159 mm)
  - Diameter: ♠♥♣ 5 ft (1,524 mm)
  - Tube plates: ♠ 11 ft 1/2 in (3,366 mm) ♥♣ 11 ft 3/8 in (3,362 mm)
  - Small tubes: ♠ 205: 2 in (51 mm) ♥♣ 115: 2 in (51 mm)
  - Large tubes: ♥♣ 18: 5 1/2 in (140 mm)
- Boiler pressure: 180 psi (1,241 kPa)
- Safety valve: Ramsbottom
- Heating surface
  - Firebox: ♠ 130 sq ft (12 m^{2}) ♥♣ 131 sq ft (12.2 m^{2})
  - Tubes: ♠ 1,184 sq ft (110.0 m^{2}) ♥♣ 950 sq ft (88 m^{2})
  - Total surface: ♠ 1,314 sq ft (122.1 m^{2}) ♥♣ 1,081 sq ft (100.4 m^{2})
- Superheater
  - Heating area: ♥♣ 214 sq ft (19.9 m^{2})
- Cylinders: Two
- Cylinder size: ♠ 18 1/2 in (470 mm) bore ♥ 19 in (483 mm) bore ♣ 20 in (508 mm) bore ♠♥♣ 24 in (610 mm) stroke
- Valve gear: Stephenson
- Valve type: ♠ Slide ♥♣ Piston
- Couplers: Johnston link-and-pin AAR knuckle (1930s)
Performance figures
- Tractive effort: ♠ 23,100 lbf (103 kN) @ 75% ♥ 24,370 lbf (108.4 kN) @ 75% ♣ 27,000 lbf (120 kN) @ 75%
Career
- Operators: Central South African Railways; South African Railways
- Class: CSAR Class 8-L3; SAR Classes 8C & 8CW
- Number in class: 30
- Numbers: CSAR 471-500, SAR 1162-1191
- Delivered: 1903
- First run: 1903
- Withdrawn: 1972
- The leading coupled axle had flangeless wheels

The South African Railways Class 8C 4-8-0 of 1903 was a steam locomotive from the pre-Union era in Transvaal Colony.

In 1903, soon after the establishment of the Central South African Railways, a second batch of thirty Cape 8th Class 4-8-0 Mastodon steam locomotives were ordered and placed in service as the Class 8-L3, immediately following upon a previous order in that same year for a variation on the same locomotive type. In 1912, when they were assimilated into the South African Railways, they were renumbered and designated Class 8C.

== Manufacturer ==
Upon the establishment of the Central South African Railways (CSAR) in July 1902, soon after the end of the Second Boer War, Chief Locomotive Superintendent P.A. Hyde became the custodian of a mixed bag of locomotives inherited from the Imperial Military Railways (IMR). Apart from those engines which had been acquired new by the IMR during the war, these included locomotives which originated with the Selati Railway, the Nederlandsche Zuid-Afrikaansche Spoorweg-Maatschappij (NZASM), the Pretoria-Pietersburg Railway (PPR) and the Oranje-Vrijstaat Gouwerment Spoorwegen (OVGS).

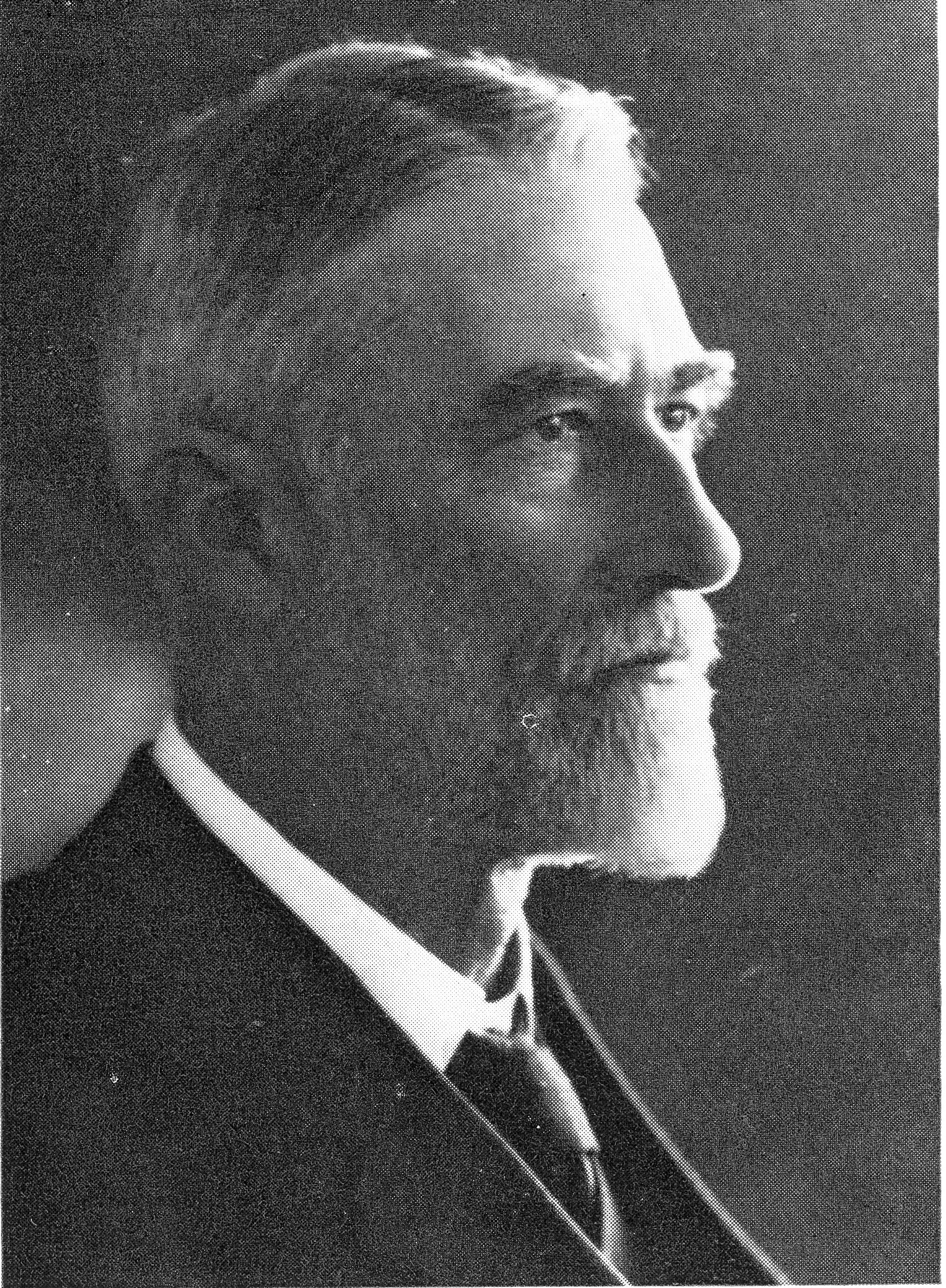
H.M. Beatty

The comparatively small number of serviceable locomotives which were immediately available for service, compounded by the poor condition of many of the original NZASM, PPR, Selati and OVGS locomotives and an expected post-war increase in traffic, led to an order for altogether sixty new steam locomotives. They were built in two versions to the specifications of the 8th Class 4-8-0 Mastodon type which had been designed by H.M. Beatty, the Chief Locomotive Superintendent of the Cape Government Railways (CGR) from 1896 to 1910.

Orders were placed with Neilson, Reid and Company in 1903, but while the locomotives were being built, Neilson, Reid amalgamated with Dübs and Company and Sharp, Stewart and Company to form the North British Locomotive Company (NBL). As a result, the thirty locomotives of the second batch, numbered in the range from 471 to 500, were all delivered as built by NBL at the Hyde Park shops of the former Neilson, Reid.

They differed from the first batch of the same order by not being equipped with Drummond water tubes in the fireboxes. To differentiate them from the Class 8-L1 and the Drummond tube-equipped Class 8-L2, these locomotives were designated the CSAR Class 8-L3. These were the last locomotives to be ordered by the CSAR which were built to the design of another railway.

== Class 8 sub-classes ==
When the Union of South Africa was established on 31 May 1910, the three Colonial government railways (CGR, Natal Government Railways and CSAR) were united under a single administration to control and administer the railways, ports and harbours of the Union. Although the South African Railways and Harbours came into existence in 1910, the actual classification and renumbering of all the rolling stock of the three constituent railways were only implemented with effect from 1 January 1912.

In 1912, these thirty locomotives were renumbered in the range from 1162 to 1191 and designated Class 8C on the South African Railways (SAR).

These locomotives, together with the CSAR's Class 8-L1 and 8-L2 4-8-0 Mastodon locomotives and all the CGR's 8th Class 2-8-0 Consolidations and 4-8-0 Mastodons, were grouped into ten different sub-classes by the SAR. The 4-8-0 locomotives became SAR Classes 8 and 8A to 8F and the 2-8-0 locomotives became Classes 8X to 8Z.

== Modification ==
During A.G. Watson's term as the Chief Mechanical Engineer of the SAR from 1929 to 1936, many of the Class 8 to Class 8F locomotives were equipped with superheated boilers, larger bore cylinders and either inside or outside admission piston valves. The outside admission valve locomotives had their cylinder bore increased from 18 1/2 inches (470 millimetres) to 19 inches (483 millimetres) and retained their existing SAR classifications, while the inside admission valve locomotives had their cylinder bore increased to 20 inches (508 millimetres) and were reclassified by having a "W" suffix added to their existing SAR classification letters.

Of the Class 8C locomotives, seven were equipped with superheating, 19 inches (483 millimetres) bore cylinders and outside admission piston valves while retaining their Class 8C classification.

Five locomotives were equipped with superheating, 20 inches (508 millimetres) bore cylinders and inside admission piston valves, and were reclassified to Class 8CW.

== Service ==
In SAR service, the 4-8-0 Class 8 family of locomotives worked on every system in the country and, in the 1920s, became the mainstay of motive power on many branch lines. Their final days were spent in shunting service. They were all withdrawn from service by 1972.

== Works numbers ==
The Class 8C and 8CW works numbers, renumbering and superheating modifications are listed in the table.

Class 8C & 8CW – Works numbers, renumbering and modification
Works No.	CSAR No.	SAR No.	SAR Model
15803	471	1162	
15804	472	1163	
15805	473	1164	Superheated
15806	474	1165	
15807	475	1166	Class 8CW
15808	476	1167	
15809	477	1168	
15810	478	1169	
15811	479	1170	Superheated
15812	480	1171	Class 8CW
15813	481	1172	
15814	482	1173	
15815	483	1174	
15816	484	1175	
15817	485	1176	
15818	486	1177	
15819	487	1178	Superheated
15820	488	1179	
15821	489	1180	Superheated
15822	490	1181	Class 8CW
15823	491	1182	
15824	492	1183	Class 8CW
15825	493	1184	Superheated
15826	494	1185	Superheated
15827	495	1186	
15828	496	1187	
15829	497	1188	
15830	498	1189	Class 8CW
15831	499	1190	Superheated
15832	500	1191	

== Illustration ==
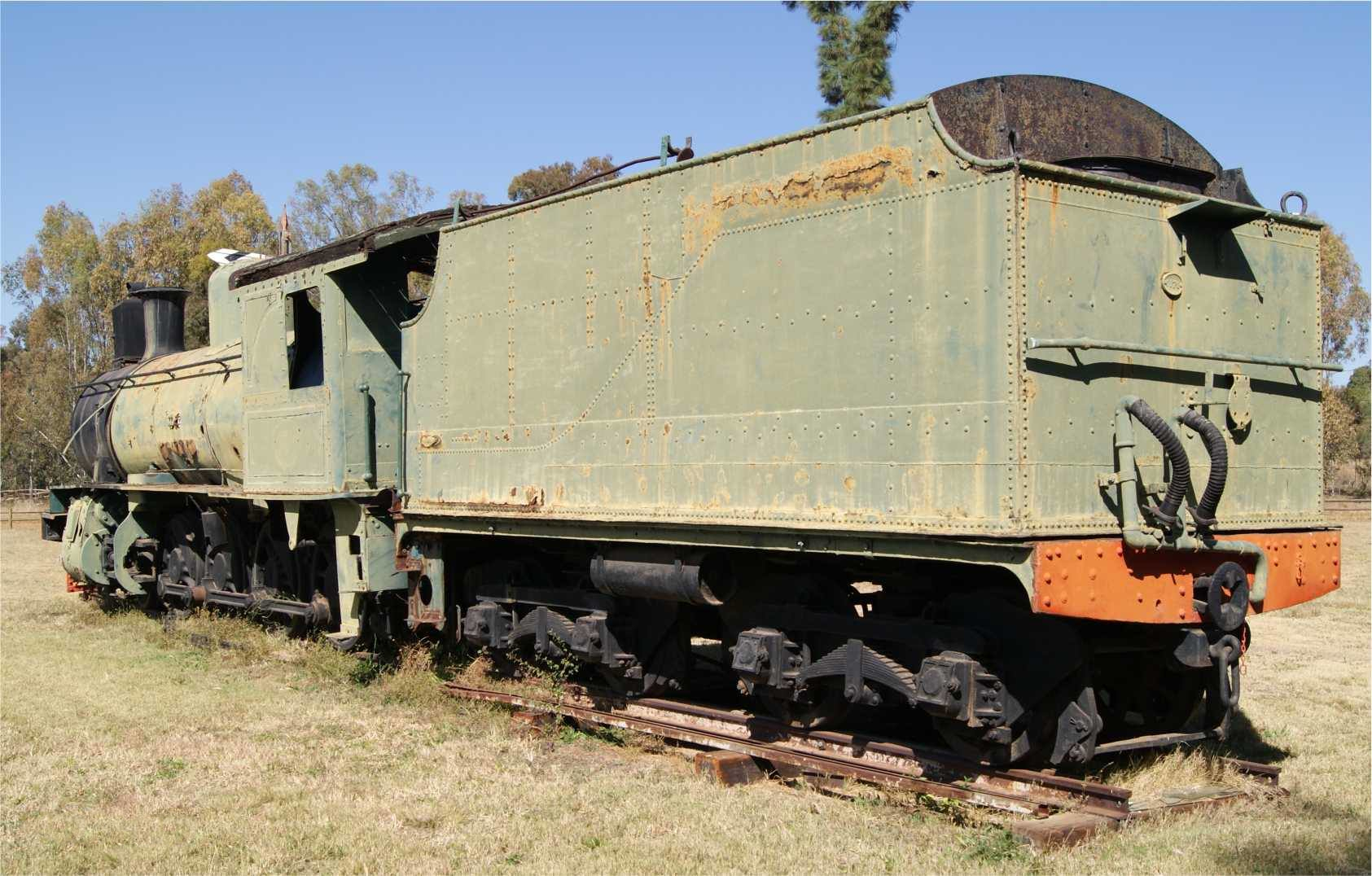
Class 8C and rebuilt Type XF tender no. 1175
