= South African Class 8A 4-8-0 =

1902 design of steam locomotive

IMR 8th Class 4-8-0 CSAR Class 8-L1 4-8-0 South African Classes 8A & 8AW 4-8-0
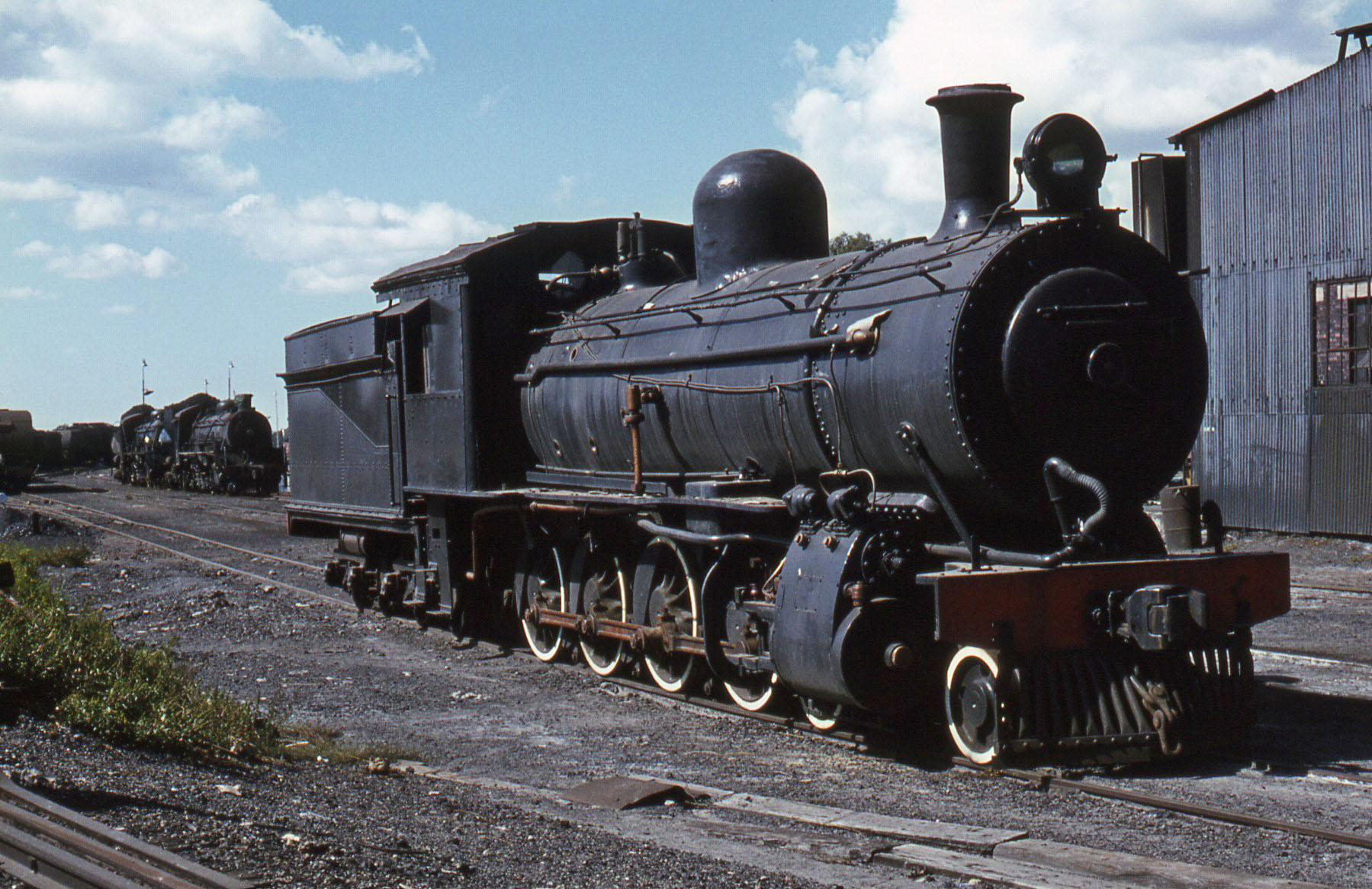
- CSAR Class 8-L1 no. 415, SAR Class 8A no. 1106, Breyten, Transvaal, 4 April 1981
Type and origin
- ♠ Original locomotive, as built ♥ Superheated, outside admission valves ♣ Superheated, inside admission valves, Class 8AW
- Power type: Steam
- Designer: Cape Government Railways (H.M. Beatty)
- Builder: Neilson, Reid and Company; Sharp, Stewart and Company
- Serial number: Neilson, Reid 6176-6195; Sharp, Stewart 4848-4867
- Model: CGR 8th Class
- Build date: 1902
- Total produced: 40
Specifications
- Configuration
  - Whyte: 4-8-0 (Mastodon)
  - UIC: ♠ 2'Dn2 - ♥♣ 2'Dh2
- Driver: 2nd coupled axle
- Gauge: 3 ft 6 in (1,067 mm) Cape gauge
- Leading dia.: 28 1/2 in (724 mm)
- Coupled dia.: 48 in (1,219 mm)
- Tender wheels: 33 1/2 in (851 mm) as built 34 in (864 mm) retyred
- Wheelbase: 46 ft 10 1/2 in (14,288 mm)
  - Engine: 23 ft 3 in (7,087 mm)
  - Leading: 6 ft (1,829 mm)
  - Coupled: 13 ft 6 in (4,115 mm)
  - Tender: 14 ft 7 in (4,445 mm)
  - Tender bogie: 4 ft 7 in (1,397 mm)
- Length
  - Over couplers: 54 ft 5 in (16,586 mm)
- Height: ♠ 12 ft 10 in (3,912 mm) ♥♣ 12 ft 8 in (3,861 mm)
- Frame type: Bar
- Axle load: ♠ 11 LT 16 cwt (11,990 kg) ♥ 12 LT (12,190 kg) ♣ 12 LT 11 cwt (12,750 kg)
  - Leading: ♠ 12 LT 7 cwt (12,550 kg) ♥♣ 12 LT 15 cwt (12,950 kg)
  - Coupled: ♥ 12 LT (12,190 kg)
  - 1st coupled: ♠ 11 LT 16 cwt (11,990 kg) ♣ 11 LT 18 cwt (12,090 kg)
  - 2nd coupled: ♠ 11 LT 16 cwt (11,990 kg) ♣ 12 LT 11 cwt (12,750 kg)
  - 3rd coupled: ♠ 11 LT 8 cwt (11,580 kg) ♣ 11 LT 19 cwt (12,140 kg)
  - 4th coupled: ♠ 11 LT 6 cwt (11,480 kg) ♣ 11 LT 18 cwt (12,090 kg)
  - Tender bogie: Bogie 1: 18 LT 4 cwt (18,490 kg); Bogie 2: 19 LT 8 cwt (19,710 kg)
  - Tender axle: 9 LT 14 cwt (9,856 kg)
- Adhesive weight: ♠ 46 LT 6 cwt (47,040 kg) ♥ 48 LT (48,770 kg) ♣ 48 LT 6 cwt (49,080 kg)
- Loco weight: ♠ 58 LT 13 cwt (59,590 kg) ♥ 60 LT 15 cwt (61,720 kg) ♣ 61 LT 1 cwt (62,030 kg)
- Tender weight: 37 LT 12 cwt (38,200 kg)
- Total weight: ♠ 96 LT 5 cwt (97,790 kg) ♥ 98 LT 7 cwt (99,930 kg) ♣ 98 LT 13 cwt (100,200 kg)
- Tender type: XF (2-axle bogies); XC, XC1, XD, XE, XE1, XF, XF1, XF2, XJ, XM, XM1, XM2, XM3 permitted
- Fuel type: Coal
- Fuel capacity: 6 LT (6.1 t)
- Water cap.: 3,000 imp gal (13,600 L)
- Firebox
  - Type: Round-top
  - Grate area: 21.35 sq ft (1.983 m^{2})
- Boiler
  - Pitch: ♠ 7 ft (2,134 mm) ♥♣ 7 ft 1 in (2,159 mm)
  - Diameter: 5 ft (1,524 mm)
  - Tube plates: ♠ 11 ft 1/2 in (3,366 mm) ♥♣ 11 ft 3/8 in (3,362 mm)
  - Small tubes: ♠ 205: 2 in (51 mm) ♥♣ 115: 2 in (51 mm)
  - Large tubes: ♥♣ 18: 5 1/2 in (140 mm)
- Boiler pressure: 180 psi (1,241 kPa)
- Safety valve: Ramsbottom
- Heating surface
  - Firebox: 131 sq ft (12.2 m^{2})
  - Tubes: ♠ 1,184 sq ft (110.0 m^{2}) ♥♣ 950 sq ft (88 m^{2})
  - Total surface: ♠ 1,315 sq ft (122.2 m^{2}) ♥♣ 1,081 sq ft (100.4 m^{2})
- Superheater
  - Heating area: ♥♣ 214 sq ft (19.9 m^{2})
- Cylinders: Two
- Cylinder size: ♠ 18 1/2 in (470 mm) bore ♥ 19 in (483 mm) bore ♣ 20 in (508 mm) bore ♠♥♣ 24 in (610 mm) stroke
- Valve gear: Stephenson
- Valve type: ♠ Balanced slide - ♥♣ Piston
- Couplers: Johnston link-and-pin AAR knuckle (1930s)
Performance figures
- Tractive effort: ♠ 23,110 lbf (102.8 kN) @ 75% ♥ 24,370 lbf (108.4 kN) @ 75% ♣ 27,000 lbf (120 kN) @ 75%
Career
- Operators: Imperial Military Railways; Central South African Railways; South African Railways; Zambesi Saw Mills; Zambia Railways
- Class: IMR 8th Class, CSAR Class 8-L1, SAR Class 8A & 8AW
- Number in class: 40
- Numbers: CSAR 401-440, SAR 1092-1131
- Delivered: 1902
- First run: 1902
- Withdrawn: 1972
- The leading coupled axle had flangeless wheels

The South African Railways Class 8A 4-8-0 of 1902 was a steam locomotive from the pre-Union era in Transvaal.

In 1902, the Imperial Military Railways placed forty Cape 8th Class 4-8-0 Mastodon type steam locomotives in service. When the Central South African Railways was established later that same year, they were designated Class 8-L1. In 1912, when they were assimilated into the South African Railways, they were renumbered and designated Class 8A.

== Manufacturers ==
Due to the shortage of locomotives brought about by wartime conditions during the Second Boer War, the Imperial Military Railways (IMR) placed orders for forty Cape 8th Class locomotives with two Scottish locomotive manufacturers in 1901. They were built to the specifications of the 8th Class 4-8-0 Mastodon type which had been designed by H.M. Beatty, the chief locomotive superintendent of the Cape Government Railways (CGR) from 1896 to 1910, and were the last locomotives to be ordered under the military administration of the railways in the Transvaal and Orange Free State.

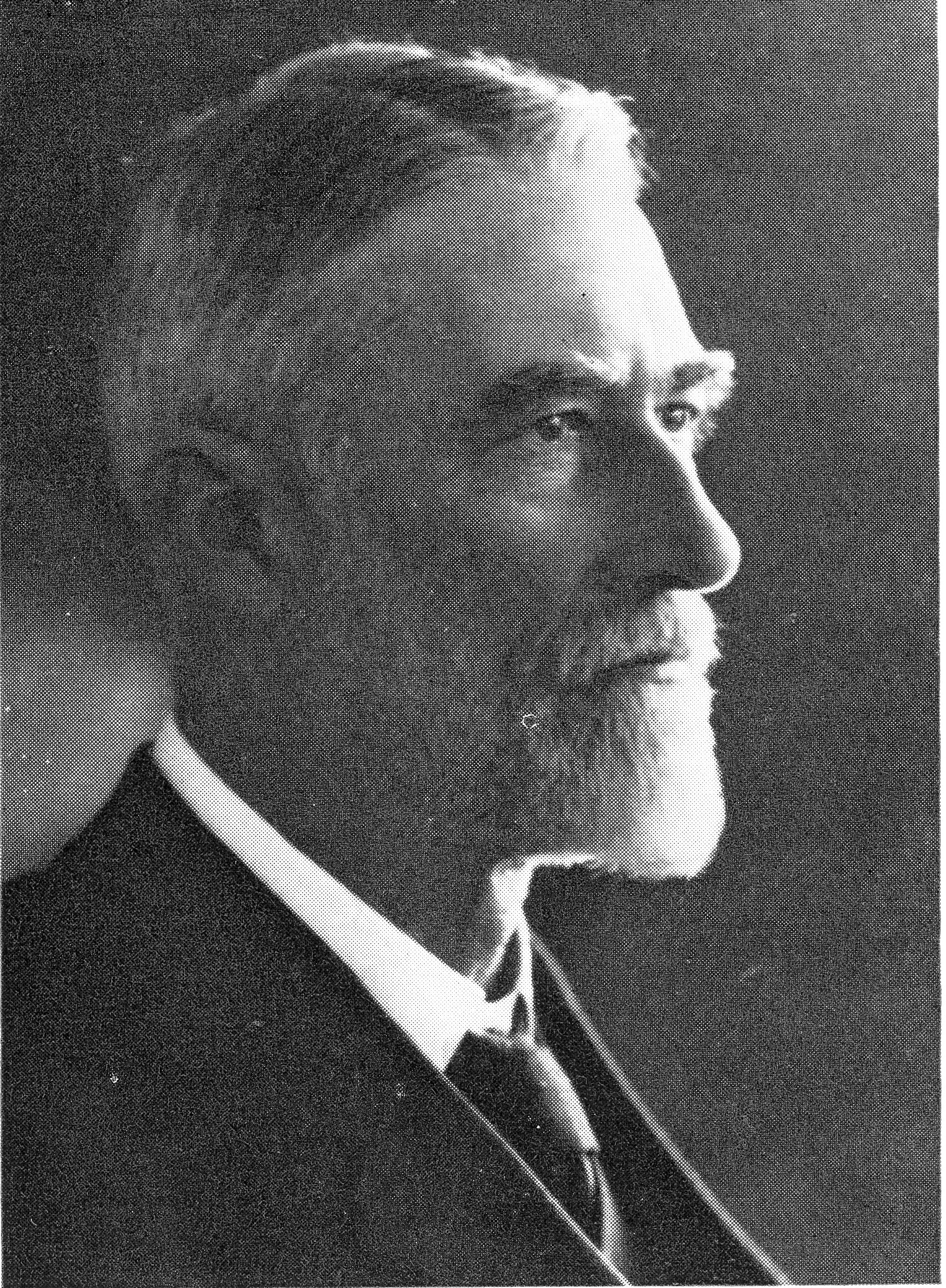
H.M. Beatty

Upon the cessation of hostilities in June 1902, the working of all railways was handed over to civil control. On 1 July 1902, the IMR became the Central South African Railways (CSAR).

These forty 8th Class locomotives therefore came onto the CSAR roster, where they were designated Class 8-L1. The twenty engines which had been built by Neilson, Reid and Company were numbered in the range from 401 to 420, and the twenty built by Sharp, Stewart and Company in the range from 421 to 440.

At least one of the engines was named. No. 428 bore the name of Secretary of State for the Colonies Joseph Chamberlain, with the name inscribed on the tender sides rather than on the engine itself.

== Characteristics ==
The cylinders were arranged outside the bar frame, with balanced slide valves above, actuated by Stephenson valve gear through rocker shafts. The locomotives were delivered with type XF tenders, which rode on 2-axle bogies and had a capacity of 10 long tons (10.2 tonnes) coal and 3,000 imperial gallons (13,600 litres) water.

== South African Railways ==
When the Union of South Africa was established on 31 May 1910, the three Colonial government railways (CGR, Natal Government Railways and CSAR) were united under a single administration to control and administer the railways, ports and harbours of the Union. Although the South African Railways and Harbours came into existence in 1910, the actual classification and renumbering of all the rolling stock of the three constituent railways were only implemented with effect from 1 January 1912.

When these forty locomotives were assimilated into the South African Railways (SAR) in 1912, they were renumbered in the range from 1092 to 1131 and designated Class 8A.

In 1912, all the CGR's 8th Class 2-8-0 Consolidation types and 8th Class 4-8-0 Mastodon types, together with the CSAR's Class 8-L2 and 8-L3 4-8-0 Mastodon type locomotives, were grouped into ten different sub-classes by the SAR. The 4-8-0 locomotives became SAR Classes 8 and 8A to 8F and the 2-8-0 locomotives became Classes 8X to 8Z.

== Modification ==
During A.G. Watson's term as Chief Mechanical Engineer (CME) of the SAR from 1929 to 1936, many of the Class 8 to Class 8F locomotives were equipped with superheated boilers, larger bore cylinders and either inside or outside admission piston valves. The outside admission valve locomotives had their cylinder bore increased from 18 1/2 inches (470 millimetres) to 19 inches (483 millimetres) and retained their existing SAR classifications, while the inside admission valve locomotives had their cylinder bore increased to 20 inches (508 millimetres) and were reclassified by having a "W" suffix added to their existing SAR classifications.

Of the Class 8A locomotives, fourteen were equipped with superheated boilers, 19 inches (483 millimetres) bore cylinders and outside admission piston valves, while retaining their Class 8A classification.

Two locomotives were equipped with superheated boilers, 20 inches (508 millimetres) bore cylinders and inside admission piston valves, and were reclassified to Class 8AW.

== Service ==
=== Government railways ===
In SAR service, the 4-8-0 Class 8 family of locomotives served on every system in the country and, in the 1920s, became the mainstay of motive power on many branch lines. Their final days were spent in shunting service. They were all withdrawn from service by 1972.

=== Industrial ===
In November 1971, one Class 8A locomotive, no. 1126, was sold to the Zambesi Saw Mills (ZSM) in Zambia. This was the last locomotive to be purchased by this logging company, which worked the teak forests which stretched 100 miles (160 kilometres) to the north-west of Livingstone in Zambia. It had built one of the longest logging railways in the world to serve its sawmill at Mulobezi.

Railway operations ceased at Mulobezi around 1972, whilst operation of the line to Livingstone was taken over by the Zambia Railways (ZR) in 1973. After logging operations had ceased and the ZR had taken over the mainline, engine no. 1126 was employed as a shunting locomotive at Mulobezi. It was returned to Livingstone in December 1975 and eventually, in June 1983, it went to the Railway Museum at Livingstone.

== Preservation ==
Number	Works nmr	THF /Private	Leaselend / Owner	Current Location	Outside South Africa	?
1097		THF	Plinth	Potchefstroom (Station)		
1100		THF	Plinth	Pietersburg (Station)		
1104		THF	Plinth	Parys (Station)		
1106		Private	Municipality	Ermelo		Plinth Town Centre
1126		Private	Livingstone Railway Museum	Livingstone Railway Museum	Zambia	
1127		Private	Municipality	Middelburg		Plinth Town Centre

== Works numbers ==
The Classes 8A and 8AW builders, works numbers, renumbering and superheating modifications are listed in the table.

Class 8A & 8AW – Builders, works numbers, renumbering and modification
Builder	Works No.	CSAR No.	SAR No.	SAR Model
Neilson Reid	6176	401	1092	Superheated
Neilson Reid	6177	402	1093	Superheated
Neilson Reid	6178	403	1094	Superheated
Neilson Reid	6179	404	1095	
Neilson Reid	6180	405	1096	
Neilson Reid	6181	406	1097	Superheated
Neilson Reid	6182	407	1098	
Neilson Reid	6183	408	1099	
Neilson Reid	6184	409	1100	Class 8AW
Neilson Reid	6185	410	1101	
Neilson Reid	6186	411	1102	
Neilson Reid	6187	412	1103	
Neilson Reid	6188	413	1104	Superheated
Neilson Reid	6189	414	1105	Class 8AW
Neilson Reid	6190	415	1106	Superheated
Neilson Reid	6191	416	1107	
Neilson Reid	6192	417	1108	
Neilson Reid	6193	418	1109	
Neilson Reid	6194	419	1110	
Neilson Reid	6195	420	1111	
Sharp Stewart	4848	421	1112	
Sharp Stewart	4849	422	1113	
Sharp Stewart	4850	423	1114	
Sharp Stewart	4851	424	1115	
Sharp Stewart	4852	425	1116	
Sharp Stewart	4853	426	1117	
Sharp Stewart	4854	427	1118	
Sharp Stewart	4855	428	1119	
Sharp Stewart	4856	429	1120	
Sharp Stewart	4857	430	1121	Superheated
Sharp Stewart	4858	431	1122	Superheated
Sharp Stewart	4859	432	1123	Superheated
Sharp Stewart	4860	433	1124	
Sharp Stewart	4861	434	1125	
Sharp Stewart	4862	435	1126	Superheated
Sharp Stewart	4863	436	1127	Superheated
Sharp Stewart	4864	437	1128	Superheated
Sharp Stewart	4865	438	1129	Superheated
Sharp Stewart	4866	439	1130	Superheated
Sharp Stewart	4867	440	1131	

== Illustration ==
The main picture shows SAR Class 8A no. 1106 at Breyten, Transvaal, on 4 April 1981, before it was plinthed at Ermelo. The original appearance of the locomotive with slide valves and its appearance after modification with outside admission piston valves are illustrated by the pictures below.

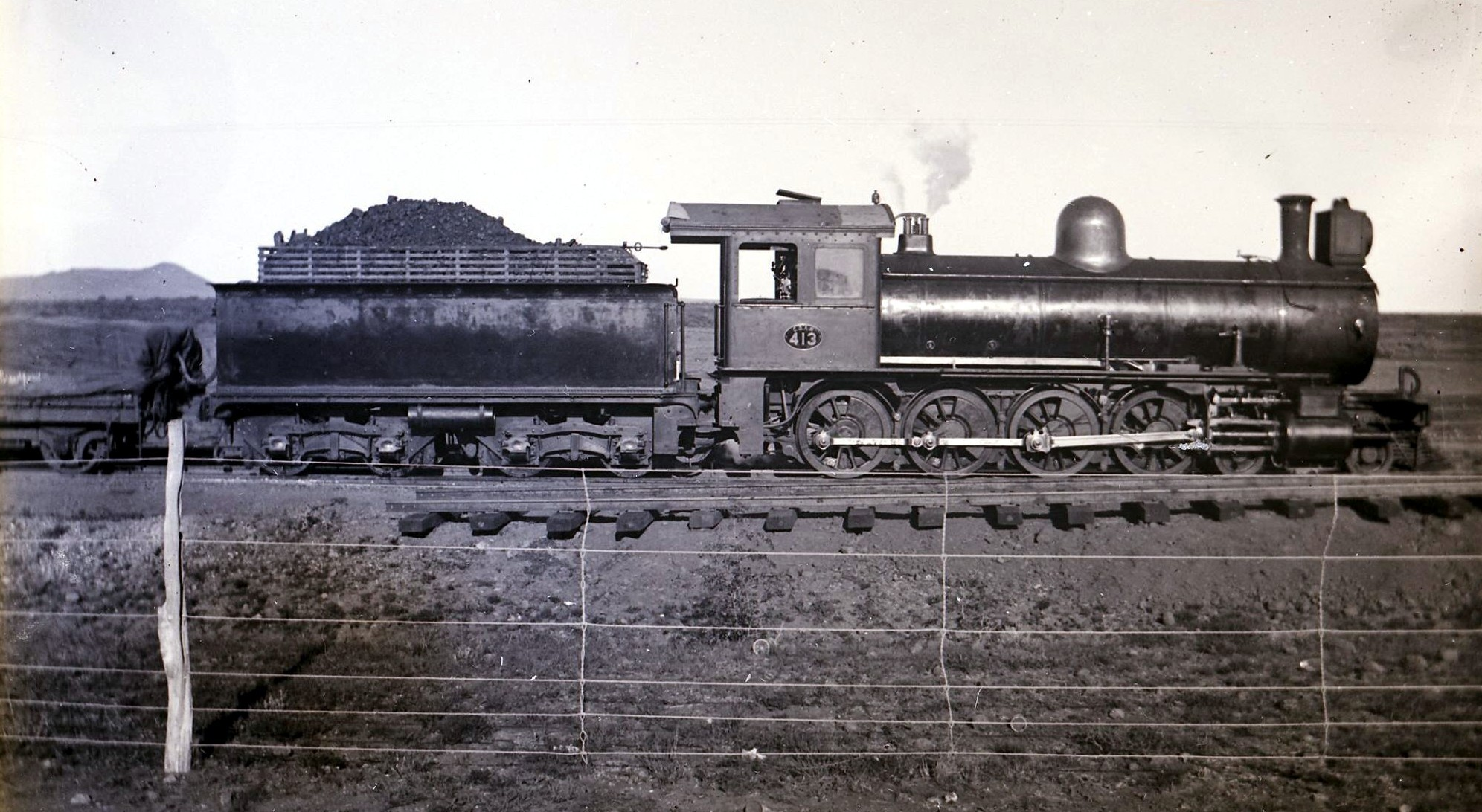
Neilson, Reid-built IMR 8th Class & CSAR Class 8-L1 no. 413, SAR Class 8A no. 1104, c. 1910

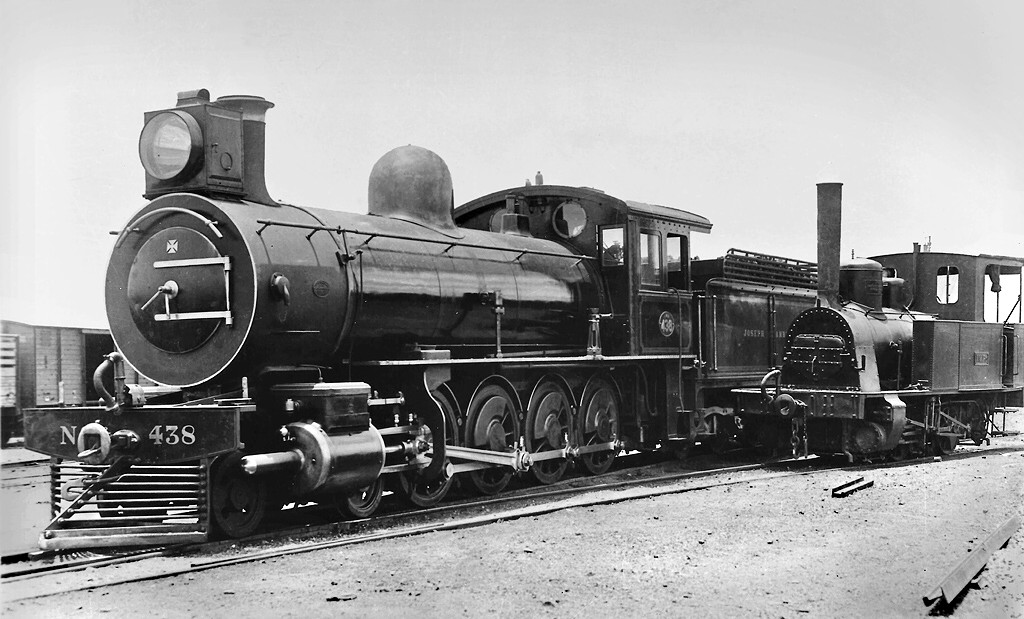
Sharp, Stewart-built no. 1129, CSAR no. 438 Joseph Chamberlain, alongside a NZASM 14 Tonner, c. 1902

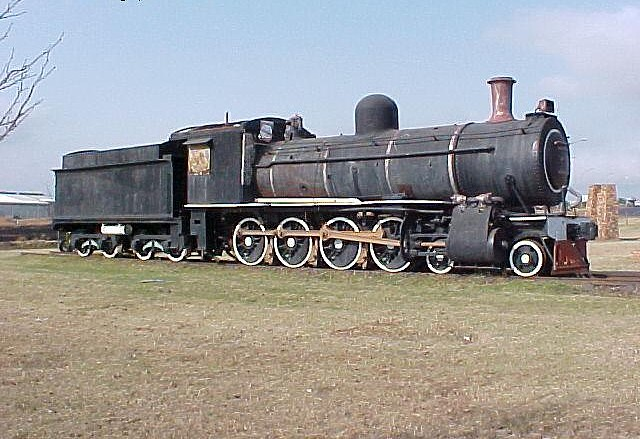
Neilson, Reid-built no. 1106, plinthed at Ermelo, Mpumalanga, 10 June 2005

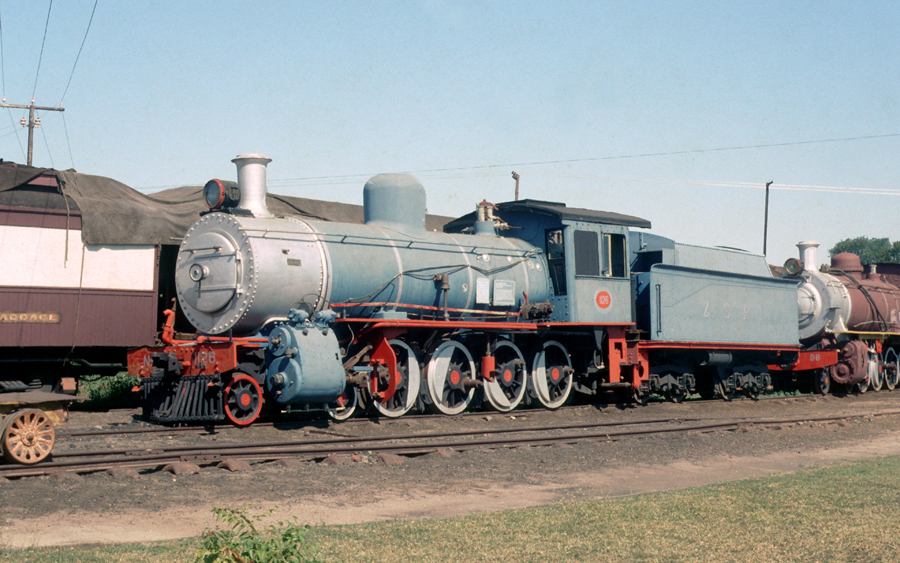
Sharp, Stewart-built no. 1126, Livingstone Railway Museum, Zambia, 31 May 1990
