= South African type XD tender =

Steam locomotive tender in South Africa

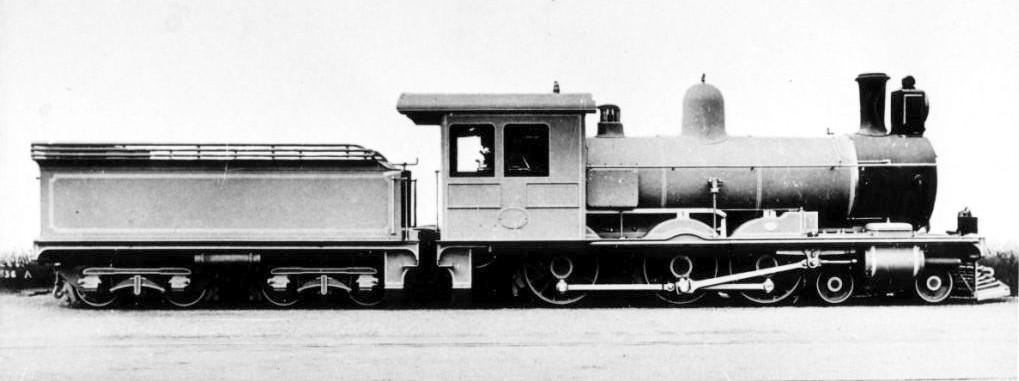
- Type XD tender on CGR 6th Class of 1901
Type and origin
- Locomotive: CGR 6th Class of 1901 (Neilson's); CGR 6th Class of 1902; CGR 8th Class of 1902 (1st)
- Designer: Cape Government Railways (H.M. Beatty)
- Builder: Neilson, Reid and Company
- In service: 1901-1902
- Rebuilder: South African Railways
- Rebuild date: c. 1925
- Rebuilt to: Type XF
Specifications
- Configuration: 2-axle bogies
- Gauge: 3 ft 6 in (1,067 mm) Cape gauge
- Length: 22 ft 1 3/8 in (6,741 mm)
- Wheel dia.: 33 1/2 in (851 mm) as built 34 in (864 mm) retyred
- Wheelbase: 14 ft 7 in (4,445 mm)
  - Bogie: 4 ft 7 in (1,397 mm)
- Axle load: 8 LT 14 cwt (8,840 kg)
  - Front bogie: 16 LT 15 cwt (17,020 kg)
  - Rear bogie: 17 LT 8 cwt (17,680 kg)
- Weight empty: 36,876 lb (16,727 kg)
- Weight w/o: 34 LT 3 cwt (34,700 kg)
- Fuel type: Coal
- Fuel cap.: 5 LT 10 cwt (5.6 t)
- Water cap.: 2,730 imp gal (12,400 L)
- Stoking: Manual
- Couplers: Drawbar & Johnston link-and-pin Drawbar & AAR knuckle (1930s)
Career
- Operators: Cape Government Railways; South African Railways
- Numbers: SAR 614-648, 1069-1071

The South African type XD tender was a steam locomotive tender from the pre-Union era in the Cape of Good Hope.

The Type XD tender first entered service in 1901, as tenders to the British-built of the three versions of 6th Class 4-6-0 Tenwheeler type steam locomotive which were acquired by the Cape Government Railways in that year. These locomotives were designated Class 6H on the South African Railways in 1912.

== Manufacturer ==
Type XD tenders were built in 1901 and 1902 by Neilson, Reid and Company.

The original 6th Class locomotive and tender was designed in 1892 by H.M. Beatty, the Locomotive Superintendent of the Cape Government Railways (CGR) Western System at the time, at its Salt River works in Cape Town. The Type XD tender first entered service in 1901, as tenders to 21 new 6th Class locomotives which were built for the CGR by Neilson, Reid.

== Characteristics ==
As built, the tender had a maximum axle load of 8 long tons 14 hundredweight 2 quarters (8,865 kilograms), a coal capacity of 5 long tons 10 hundredweight (5.6 tonnes) and a water capacity of 2,730 imperial gallons (12,400 litres; 3,280 US gallons).

== Locomotives ==
In the South African Railways (SAR) years, tenders were numbered for the engines they were delivered with. In most cases, an oval number plate, bearing the engine number and often also the tender type and locomotive class, would be attached to the rear end of the tender. During the classification and renumbering of locomotives onto the SAR roster in 1912, no separate classification and renumbering list was published for tenders, which should have been renumbered according to the locomotive renumbering list.

Three locomotive classes were delivered new with Type XD tenders, built by the same manufacturer. Bearing in mind that tenders could and did migrate between engines, these tenders should have been numbered in the SAR number ranges as shown.

- 1901: CGR 6th Class of 1901 (Neilson's), SAR Class 6H, numbers 614 to 634.
- 1902: CGR 6th Class of 1902, SAR Class 6J, numbers 635 to 648.
- 1902: CGR 8th Class of 1902, SAR Class 8, first batch, numbers 1069 to 1071.

== Classification letters ==
Since many tender types are interchangeable between different locomotive classes and types, a tender classification system was adopted by the SAR. The first letter of the tender type indicates the classes of engines to which it can be coupled. The "X_" tenders could be used with the locomotive classes as shown.

- CGR Mountain, SAR Class 4.
- SAR Class 4A.
- SAR Class 5.
- CGR 6th Class of 1897, SAR Class 6B.
- Oranje-Vrijstaat Gouwerment-Spoorwegen 6th Class L3, SAR Class 6E.
- CGR 6th Class of 1901 (Neilson, Reid), SAR Class 6H.
- CGR 6th Class of 1902, SAR Class 6J.
- CGR 8th Class of 1902, SAR Class 8.
- Imperial Military Railways 8th Class, SAR Class 8A.
- Central South African Railways Class 8-L2, SAR Class 8B.
- Central South African Railways Class 8-L3, SAR Class 8C.
- CGR 8th Class 4-8-0 of 1903, SAR Class 8D.
- CGR 8th Class Experimental, SAR Class 8E.
- CGR 8th Class 4-8-0 of 1904, SAR Class 8F.
- CGR 8th Class 2-8-0 of 1903, SAR Class 8Y.
- CGR 8th Class 2-8-0 of 1904, SAR Class 8Z.
- Central South African Railways Class 9, SAR Class 9.
- Central South African Railways Class 10, SAR Class 10.
- Central South African Railways Class 10-2 Saturated, SAR Class 10A.
- Central South African Railways Class 10-2 Superheated. SAR Class 10B.
- Central South African Railways Class 10-C, SAR Class 10C.
- Central South African Railways Class 11, SAR Class 11.
- CGR 9th Class of 1903, SAR Class Experimental 4.
- CGR 9th Class of 1906, SAR Class Experimental 5.
- CGR 10th Class, SAR Class Experimental 6.
- SAR Class ME.
- Central South African Railways Mallet Superheated, SAR Class MF.

The second letter indicates the tender's water capacity. The "_D" tenders had a capacity of between 2,730 and 2,780 imperial gallons (12,400 and 12,600 litres; 3,280 and 3,340 US gallons).

== Modifications and rebuilding ==
=== Modifications ===
The original slatted upper sides of the Type XD tender's coal bunker were soon replaced by sheet-metal sides to increase the coal capacity.

=== Rebuilding ===
From c. 1925, some Type XD tenders from Classes 6H, 6J and 8 were completely rebuilt by the SAR, by mounting a new upper structure on the existing underframe. Since their new tanks increased their water capacity to 3,000 imperial gallons (13,600 litres), these tenders were reclassified to Type XF. They had a coal capacity of 10 long tons (10.2 tonnes) and a maximum axle load of 11 long tons 3 hundredweight 2 quarters (11,350 kilograms). These rebuilt tenders had a more modern appearance, with flush sides all the way to the top of the coal bunker.

The program to rebuild several older tender types with new upper structures was begun by Col F.R. Collins DSO, who approved several of the detailed drawings for the work during his term in office as Chief Mechanical Engineer of the SAR from 1922 to 1929. It was continued by his successor, A.G. Watson.

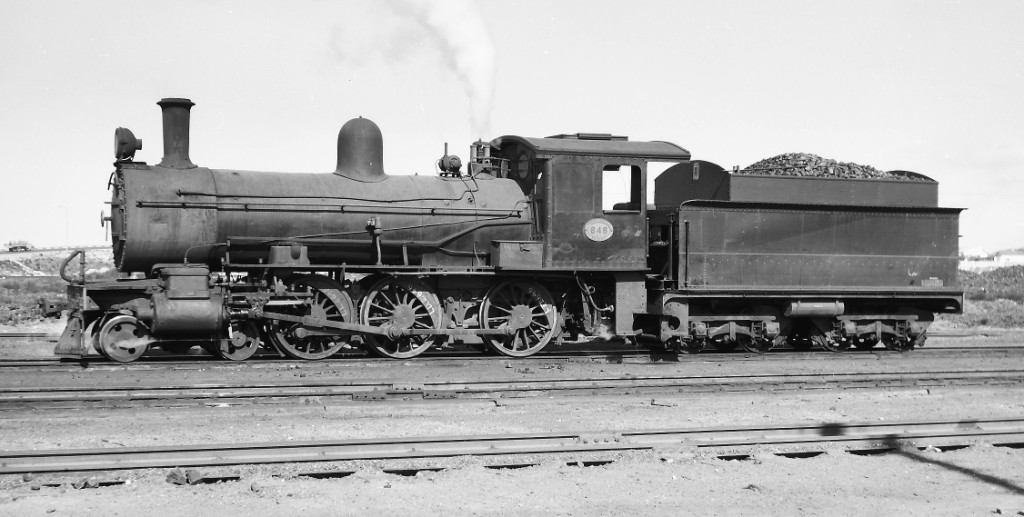
Modified Type XD on SAR Class 6J, 29 December 1965

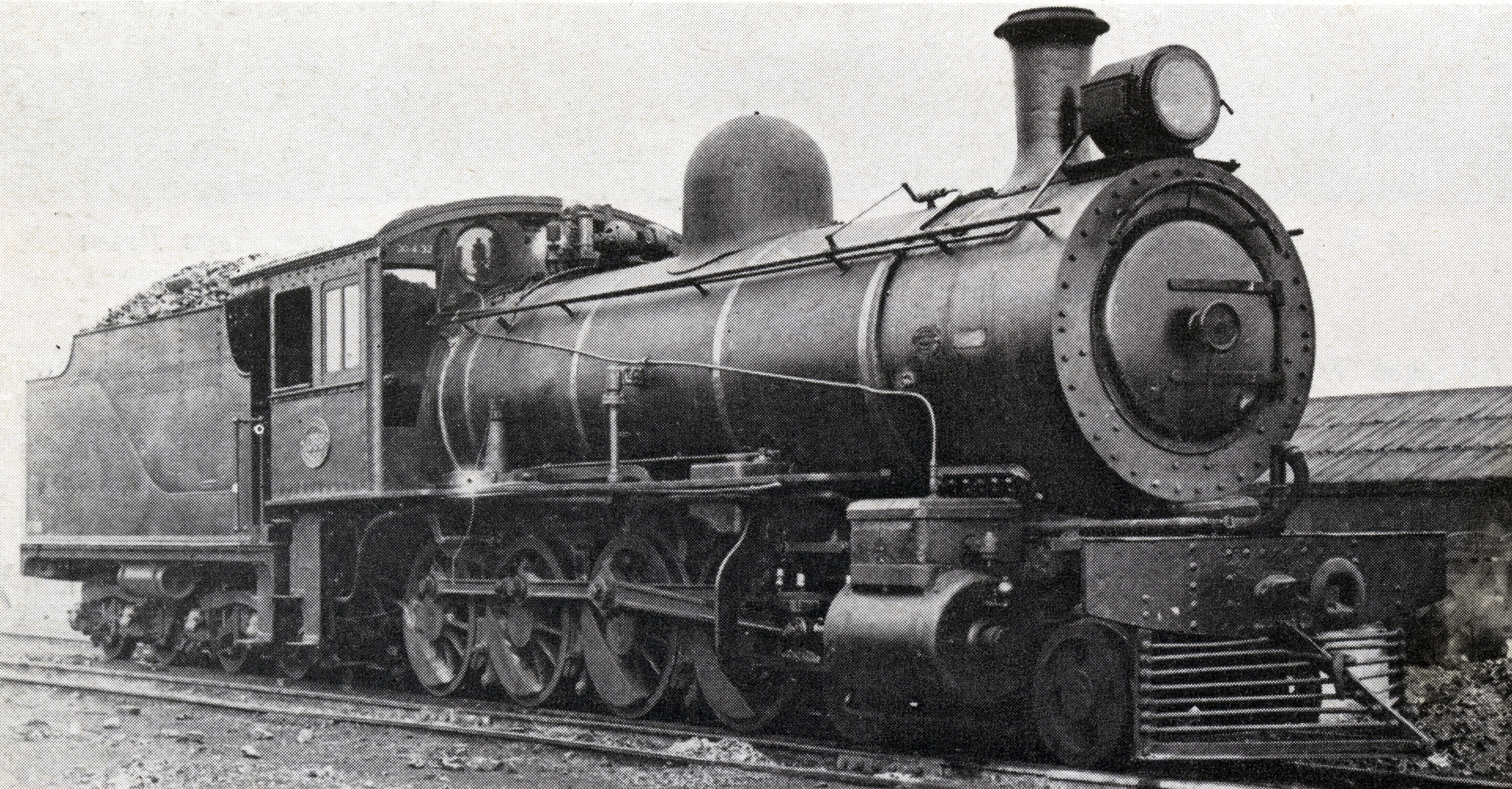
Rebuilt flush-sided Type XF tender on Class 8, c. 1930
