= South African Class 6H 4-6-0 =

1901 design of steam locomotive

CGR 6th Class 4-6-0 1901 Neilson Reid South African Class 6H 4-6-0
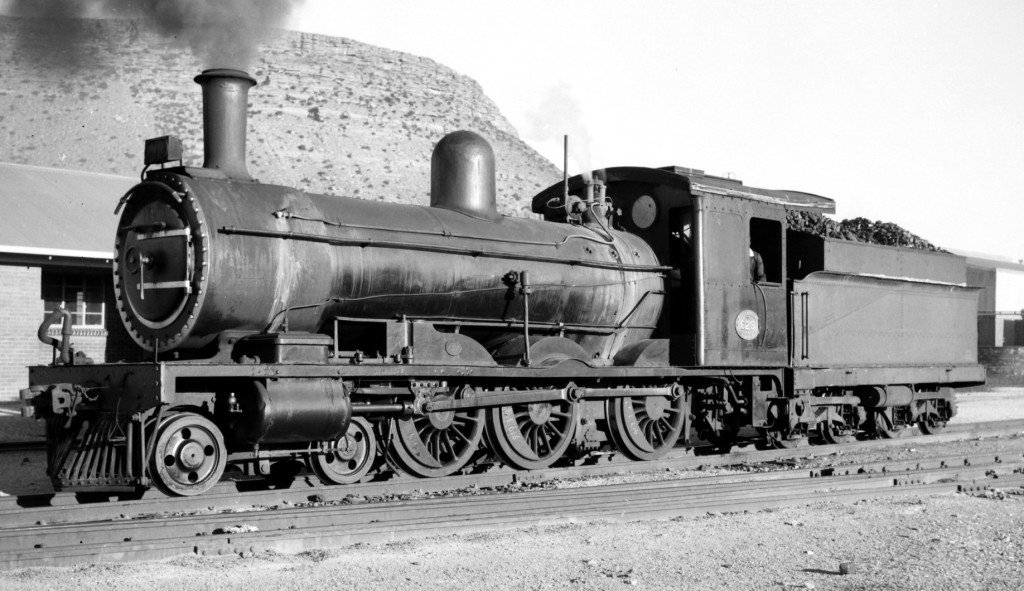
- CGR 6th Class no. 607, then no. 547, SAR Class 6H no. 629, at Midlandia Loco, Noupoort
Type and origin
- Power type: Steam
- Designer: Cape Government Railways (H.M. Beatty)
- Builder: Neilson, Reid and Company
- Serial number: 5871–5891
- Model: CGR 6th Class
- Build date: 1901
- Total produced: 21
Specifications
- Configuration
  - Whyte: 4-6-0 (Tenwheeler)
  - UIC: 2'Cn2
- Driver: 2nd coupled axle
- Gauge: 3 ft 6 in (1,067 mm) Cape gauge
- Leading dia.: 28 1/2 in (724 mm)
- Coupled dia.: 54 in (1,372 mm)
- Tender wheels: 33 1/2 in (851 mm) as built 34 in (864 mm) retyred
- Wheelbase: 45 ft 8 1/2 in (13,932 mm)
  - Axle spacing (Asymmetrical): 1-2: 4 ft 9 in (1,448 mm); 2-3: 6 ft 7 in (2,007 mm)
  - Engine: 20 ft 8 in (6,299 mm)
  - Leading: 5 ft 6 in (1,676 mm)
  - Coupled: 11 ft 4 in (3,454 mm)
  - Tender: 14 ft 7 in (4,445 mm)
  - Tender bogie: 4 ft 7 in (1,397 mm)
- Length
  - Over couplers: 52 ft 11 3/4 in (16,148 mm)
- Height: 12 ft 10 in (3,912 mm)
- Frame type: Plate
- Axle load: 12 LT 11 cwt (12,750 kg)
  - Leading: 11 LT 14 cwt (11,890 kg)
  - Coupled: 12 LT 11 cwt (12,750 kg)
  - Tender bogie: Bogie 1: 16 LT 15 cwt (17,020 kg); Bogie 2: 17 LT 8 cwt (17,680 kg)
  - Tender axle: 8 LT 14 cwt (8,840 kg)
- Adhesive weight: 37 LT 13 cwt (38,250 kg)
- Loco weight: 49 LT 7 cwt (50,140 kg)
- Tender weight: 34 LT 3 cwt (34,700 kg)
- Total weight: 83 LT 10 cwt (84,840 kg)
- Tender type: XD (2-axle bogies); XC, XC1, XD, XE, XE1, XF, XF1, XF2, XJ, XM, XM1, XM2, XM3, XM4, XP1, XS permitted
- Fuel type: Coal
- Fuel capacity: 5 LT 10 cwt (5.6 t)
- Water cap.: 2,730 imp gal (12,400 L)
- Firebox
  - Type: Round-top
  - Grate area: 18 sq ft (1.7 m^{2})
- Boiler
  - Pitch: 6 ft 10 in (2,083 mm)
  - Diameter: 4 ft 6 in (1,372 mm)
  - Tube plates: 11 ft 2 1/8 in (3,407 mm)
  - Small tubes: 185: 1 7/8 in (48 mm)
- Boiler pressure: 180 psi (1,241 kPa); 170 psi (1,172 kPa) adjusted
- Safety valve: Ramsbottom
- Heating surface
  - Firebox: 115 sq ft (10.7 m^{2})
  - Tubes: 1,015 sq ft (94.3 m^{2})
  - Total surface: 1,130 sq ft (105 m^{2})
- Cylinders: Two
- Cylinder size: 17 in (432 mm) bore 26 in (660 mm) stroke
- Valve gear: Stephenson
- Couplers: Johnston link-and-pin AAR knuckle (1930s)
Performance figures
- Tractive effort: 18,780 lbf (83.5 kN) @ 75% 17,740 lbf (78.9 kN) adjusted
Career
- Operators: Cape Government Railways; South African Railways
- Class: CGR 6th Class, SAR Class 6H
- Number in class: 21
- Numbers: CGR 278–286, 601–612 (541–552); SAR 614–634
- Delivered: 1901
- First run: 1901

The South African Railways Class 6H 4-6-0 of 1901 was a steam locomotive from the pre-Union era in the Cape of Good Hope.

In 1901, 21 6th Class 4-6-0 steam locomotives were placed in service by the Cape Government Railways, built to the older 6th Class designs with plate frames. In 1912, when they were assimilated into the South African Railways, they were renumbered and designated Class 6H.

== Manufacturer ==
The original Cape 6th Class locomotive was designed at the Salt River works of the Cape Government Railways (CGR), at the same time as the 7th Class.

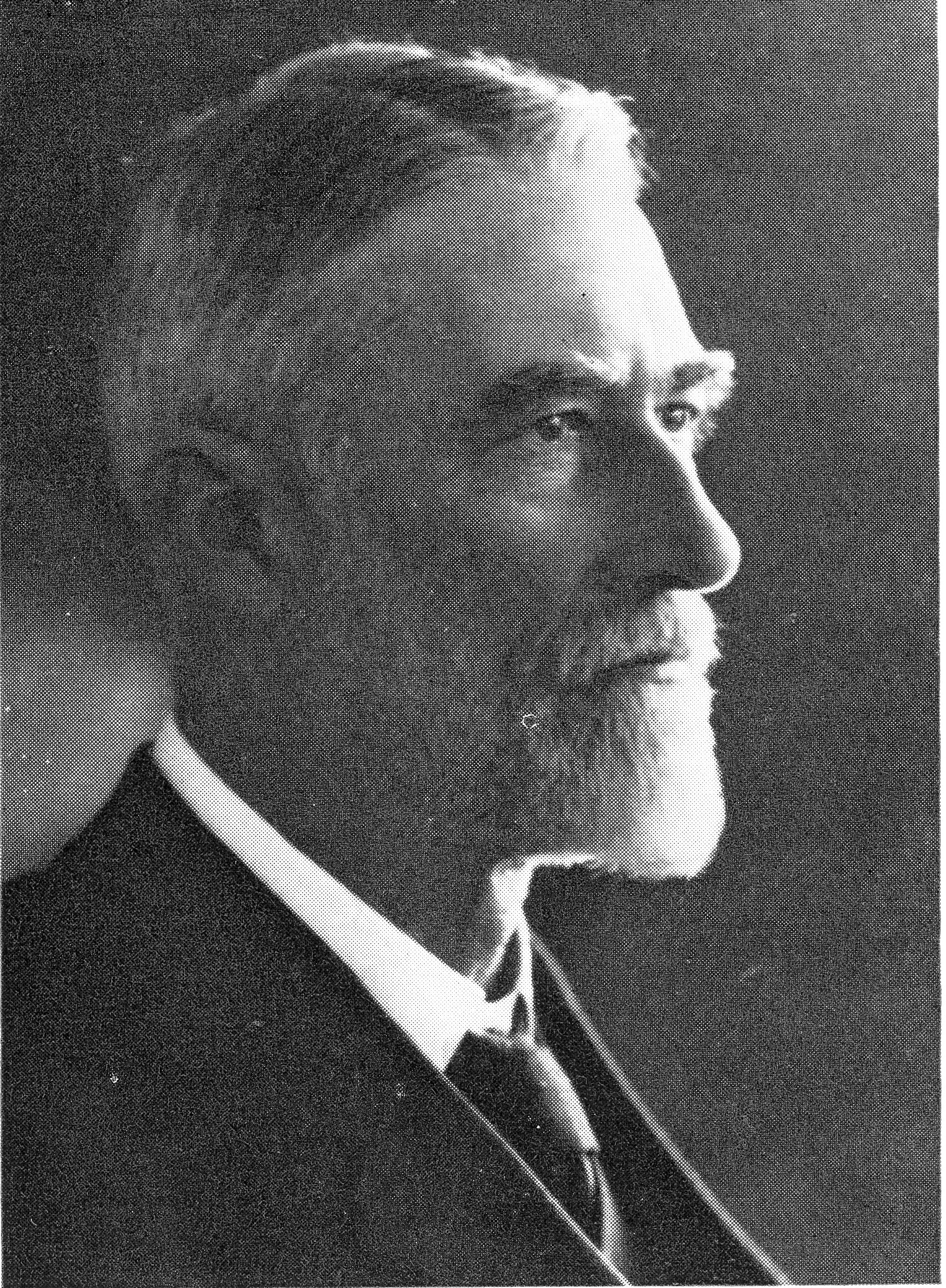
H.M. Beatty

Three new versions of the 6th Class locomotive entered service on the CGR in 1901, two American-built and one British-built. The British version was built by Neilson, Reid and Company, who delivered 21 engines. With these locomotives, CGR Chief Locomotive Superintendent H.M. Beatty kept to the older plate frame design, but fitted the larger type of cab. These locomotives were also equipped with the 17 inches (432 millimetres) diameter cylinders which had been used on all previous 6th Class locomotives with the exception of the Class 6G. Another similarity to the early 6th Class locomotives was their lower running boards with fairings or splashers over the coupled wheels.

Upon delivery, nine of them were numbered in the range from 278 to 286 and allocated to the Western System of the CGR. The other twelve were numbered in the range from 601 to 612 for the Midland System, but later renumbered in the range from 541 to 552.

== Drummond tubes ==
One of these locomotives, the Western System's no. 286, was an experimental locomotive, equipped with Drummond water tubes in the firebox and a very large panelled cab. Drummond tubes involved the installation of cross-water tubes in the firebox, as featured on the London and South Western Railway's T9 Class and L11 Class, in an attempt to increase the heating surface area of the water, albeit at the cost of increased boiler complexity. On CGR no. 286, as built, visible exterior evidence of the presence of Drummond tubes was rectangular covers attached to the sides of the firebox just ahead of the cab.

In service, it was found that the tubes did not affect the steaming capacity of the boiler to any significant extent. Instead, the tubes were inclined to leak and were difficult to maintain. It was therefore not long before the tubes were removed. At the same time, the cab was changed to the standard type, as used on the other twenty locomotives.

== Class 6 sub-classes ==
When the Union of South Africa was established on 31 May 1910, the three Colonial government railways (CGR, Natal Government Railways and Central South African Railways) were united under a single administration to control and administer the railways, ports and harbours of the Union. Although the South African Railways and Harbours came into existence in 1910, the actual classification and renumbering of all the rolling stock of the three constituent railways were only implemented with effect from 1 January 1912.

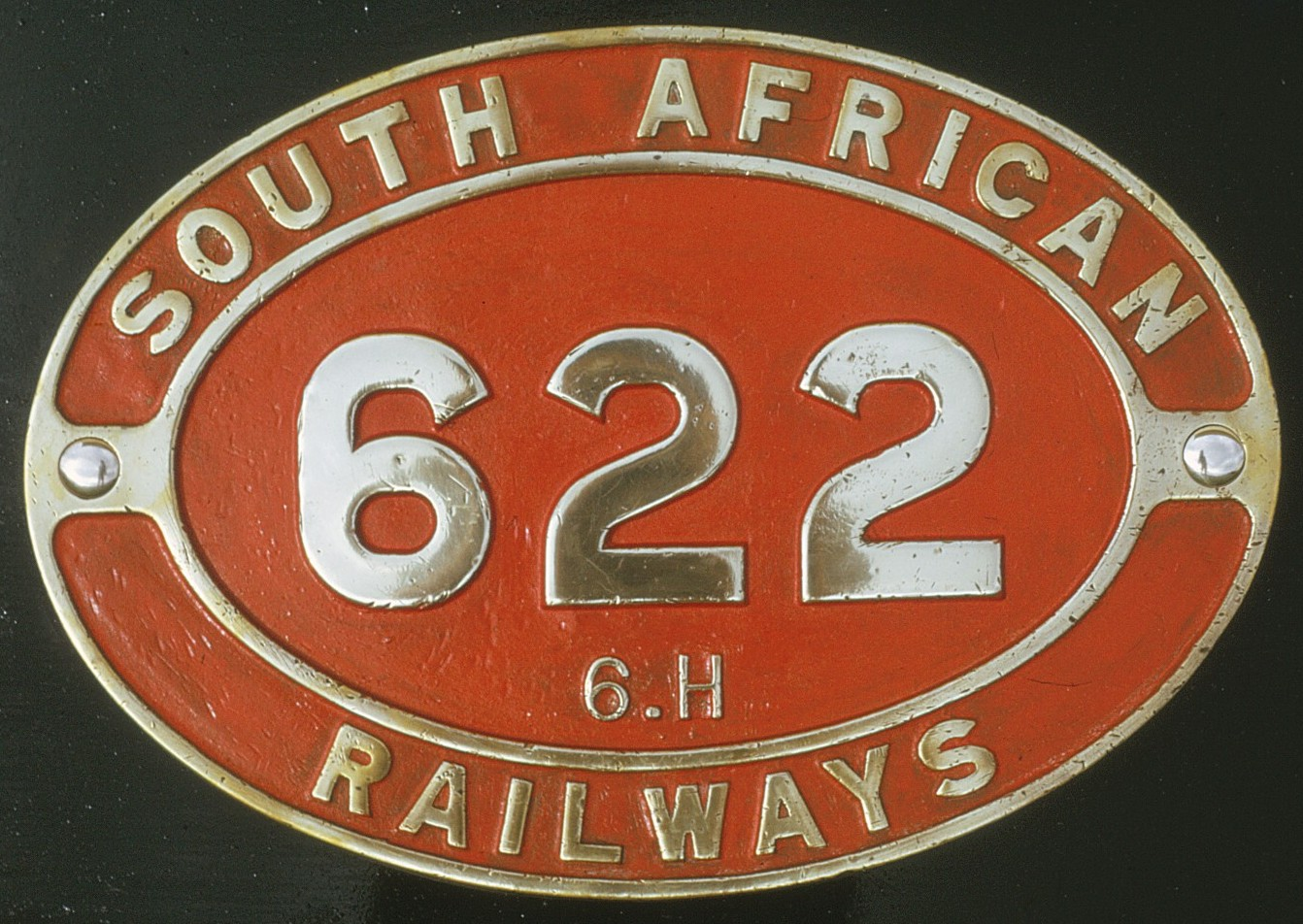

When these locomotives were assimilated into the South African Railways (SAR) in 1912, they were renumbered in the range from 614 to 634 and designated Class 6H.

The rest of the CGR's 6th Class locomotives, together with the Central South African Railways (CSAR) Classes 6-L1 to 6-L3 locomotives which had been inherited from the Oranje-Vrijstaat Gouwerment-Spoorwegen (OVGS) via the Imperial Military Railways (IMR), were grouped into thirteen more sub-classes by the SAR. The 4-6-0 locomotives became SAR Classes 6, 6A to 6G and 6J to 6L, the 2-6-2 locomotives became Class 6Y and the 2-6-4 locomotives became Class 6Z.

== Service ==
The Class 6 family of locomotives were introduced primarily as passenger locomotives, but when the class became displaced by larger and more powerful locomotive classes, it literally became a Jack-of-all-trades. It went on to see service in all parts of the country, except in Natal, and was used on all types of traffic.

After the Simon's Town line in Cape Town was electrified in 1928, Class 6H engines that used to haul commuters on this line became dock shunting engines in Table Bay Harbour. This continued until they were gradually replaced by new Class S2 0-8-0 shunting engines from 1952.

== Renumbering ==
The table lists the Class 6H works numbers and renumbering.

Class 6H 4-6-0 Works Numbers & Renumbering
Works no.	CGR no.	CGR Renumber	SAR no.
5883	278		614
5884	279		615
5885	280		616
5886	281		617
5887	282		618
5888	283		619
5889	284		620
5891	285		621
5890	286		622
5871	601	541	623
5872	602	542	624
5873	603	543	625
5874	604	544	626
5875	605	545	627
5876	606	546	628
5877	607	547	629
5878	608	548	630
5879	609	549	631
5880	610	550	632
5881	611	551	633
5882	612	552	634

== Commemoration ==
A 25c postage stamp which depicted a Class 6H locomotive was one of a set of four commemorative postage stamps which were issued by the South African Post Office on 27 April 1983 to commemorate the steam locomotives of South Africa, which were rapidly being withdrawn from service at the time. The artwork and stamp design was by the noted stamp designer and artist Hein Botha.

The particular locomotive depicted was ex CGR (Midland System) 6th Class no. 605, renumbered to CGR no. 545 and later SAR Class 6H no. 627, which was withdrawn from service in 1971 and plinthed at the Mafikeng Museum in 1972. The outline of a traditional SAR locomotive number plate was used on the date of release as a commemorative cancellation for De Aar.

== Illustration ==
The main picture and the following show the differences in appearance of the Class 6H during its service life, with different cabs, headlights and cowcatcher designs.

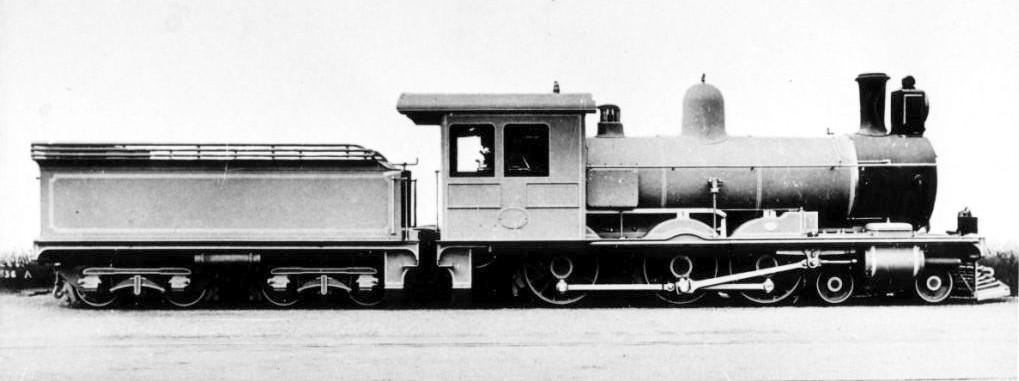
CGR Western System no. 286, as built, with Drummond tubes and large cab

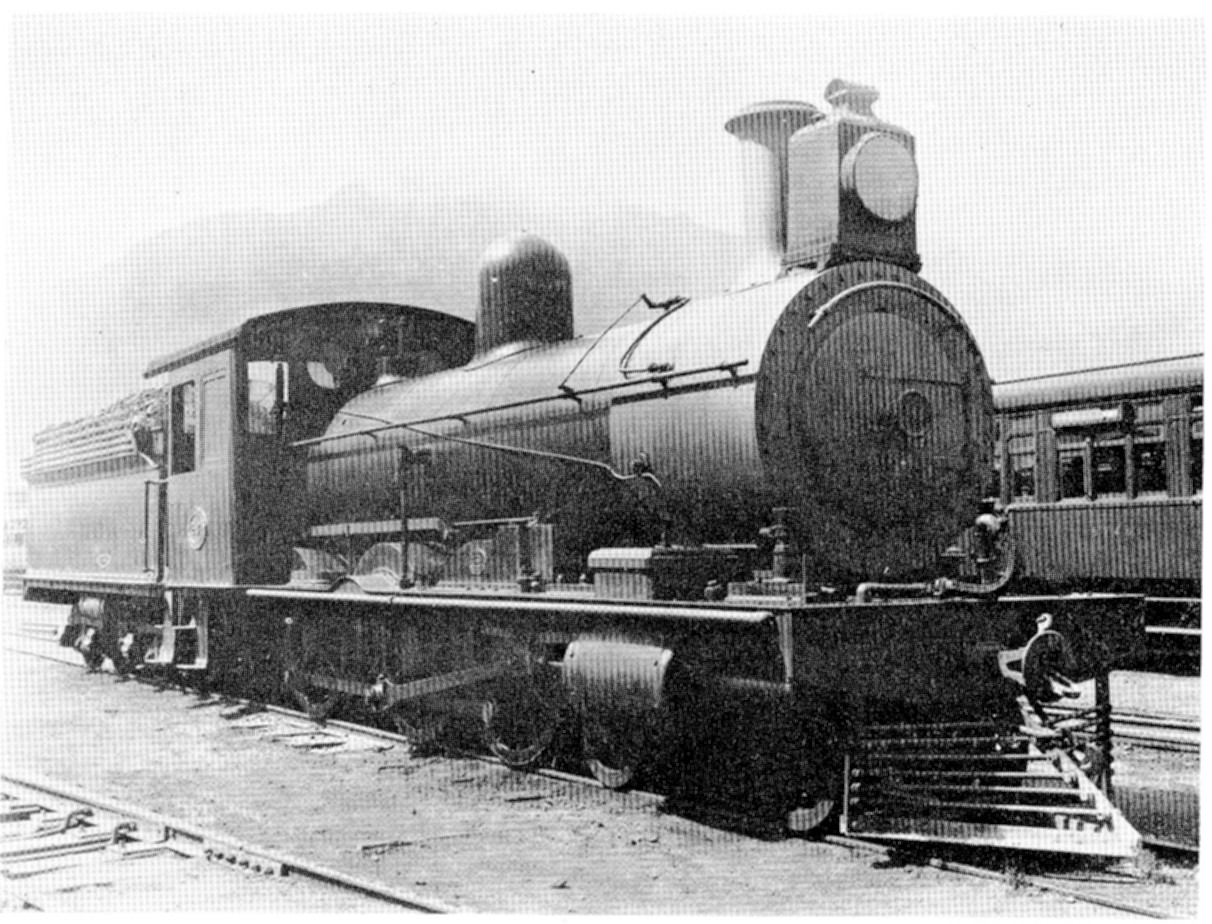
Ex CGR Midland System 6th Class no. 609, renumbered to CGR no. 549 and later SAR Class 6H no. 631, with a large headlight

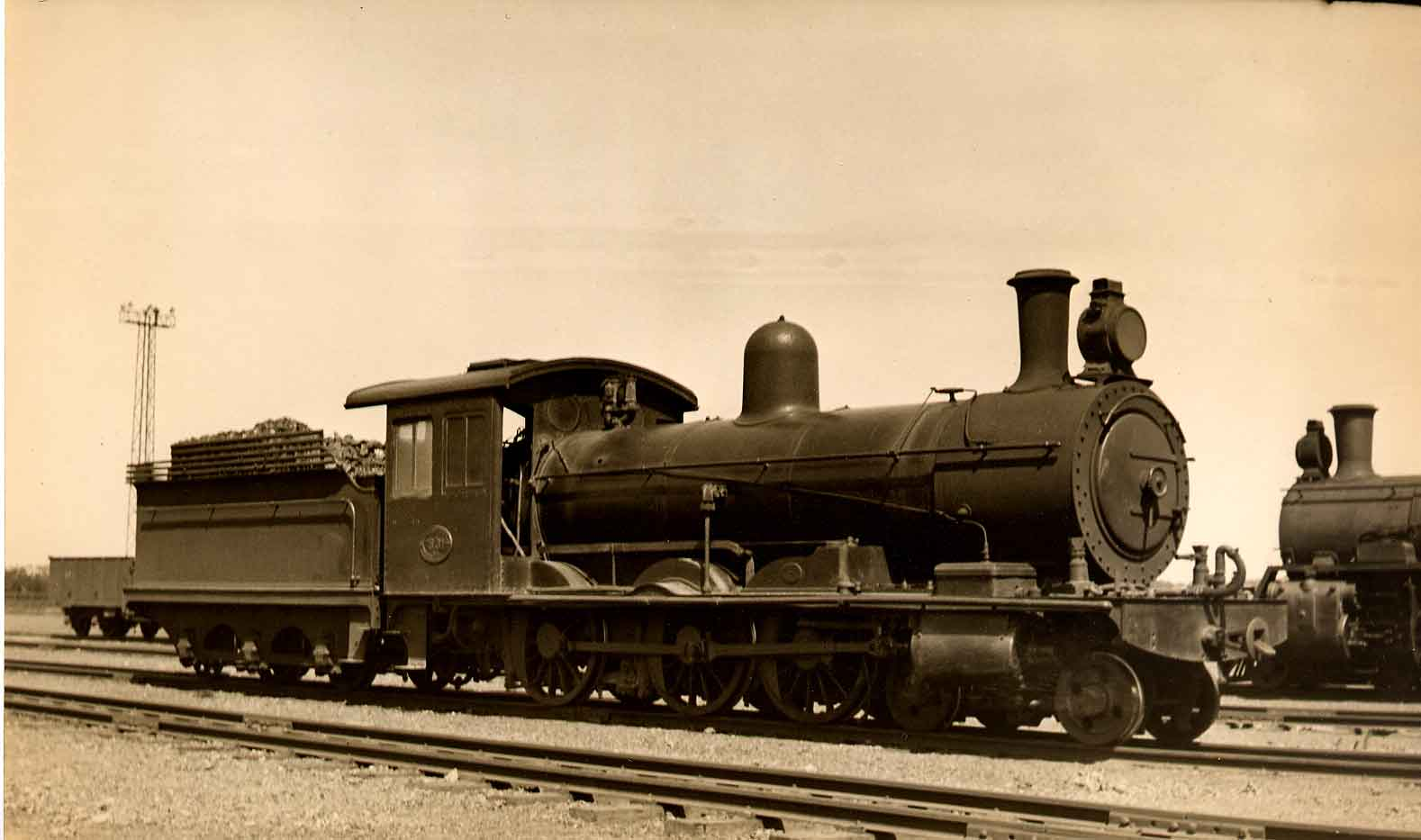
SAR Class 6H no. 631, ex CGR Midland System 6th Class no. 609, later renumbered to CGR no. 549, with a smaller round paraffin headlight and without a cowcatcher
