= South African Class 8 4-8-0 =

1902 design of steam locomotive

CGR 8th Class 4-8-0 1902 South African Classes 8 and 8W 4-8-0
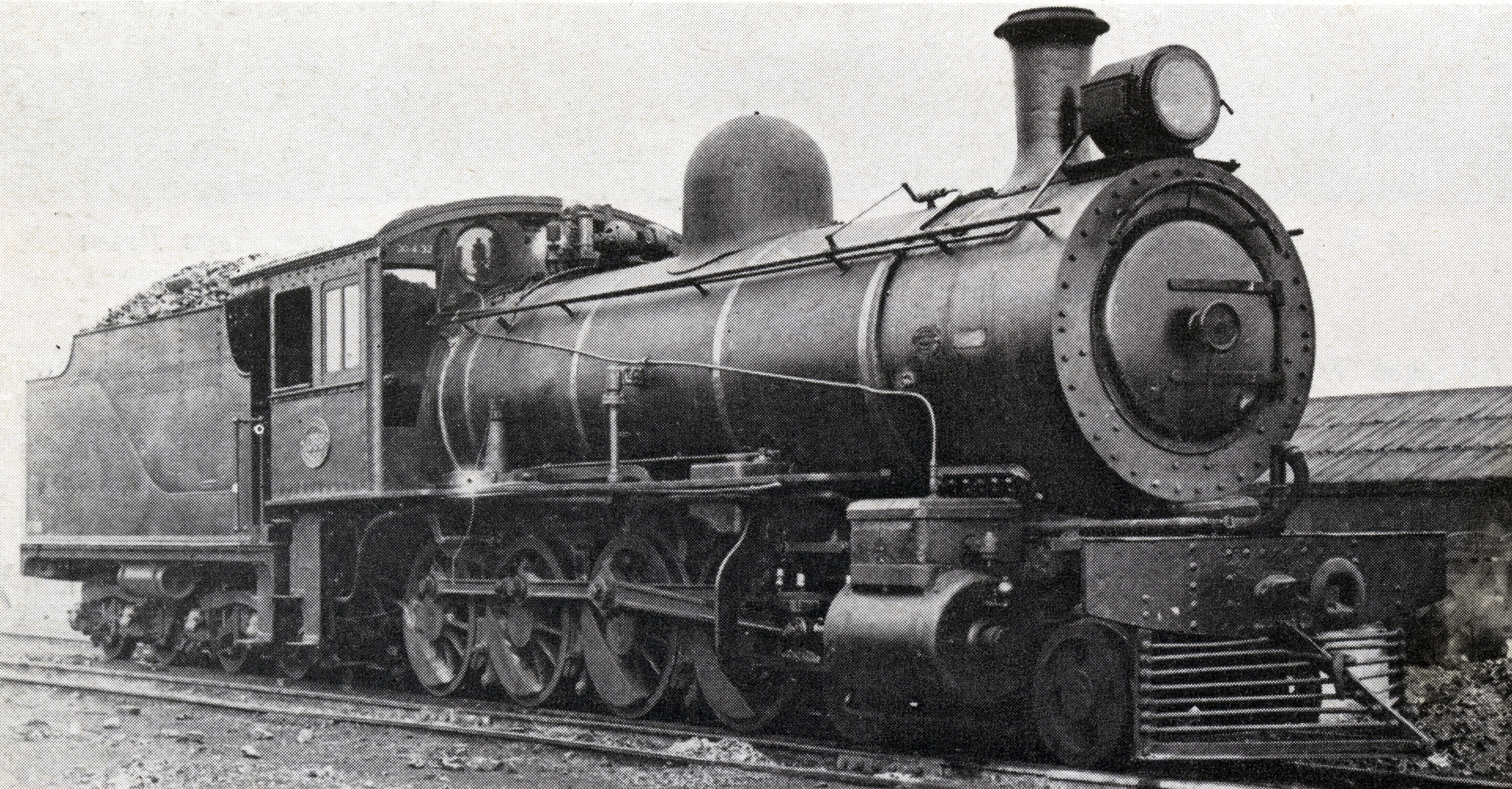
- CGR (Eastern System) 8th Class no. 779; SAR Class 8 no. 1088, East London, c. 1930
Type and origin
- ♠ Original locomotive, as built ♥ Superheated, outside admission valves ♣ Superheated, inside admission valves, Class 8W ʘ XD tender – ♦ XE1 tender – ʘ XF tender
- Power type: Steam
- Designer: Cape Government Railways (H.M. Beatty)
- Builder: Neilson, Reid and Company
- Serial number: 6111–6113, 6216–6225, 6241–6250
- Model: CGR 8th Class (4-8-0)
- Build date: 1901–1902
- Total produced: 23
Specifications
- Configuration
  - Whyte: 4-8-0 (Mastodon)
  - UIC: ♠ 2'Dn2 – ♥♣ 2'Dh2
- Driver: 2nd coupled axle
- Gauge: 3 ft 6 in (1,067 mm) Cape gauge
- Leading dia.: 28 1/2 in (724 mm)
- Coupled dia.: 48 in (1,219 mm)
- Tender wheels: ʘ♦ʘ 33 1/2 in (851 mm) as built ʘ♦ʘ 34 in (864 mm) retyred
- Wheelbase: 46 ft 10 1/2 in (14,288 mm)
  - Engine: 23 ft 3 in (7,087 mm)
  - Leading: 6 ft (1,829 mm)
  - Coupled: 13 ft 6 in (4,115 mm)
  - Tender: ʘ♦ʘ 14 ft 7 in (4,445 mm)
  - Tender bogie: ʘ♦ʘ 4 ft 7 in (1,397 mm)
- Length
  - Over couplers: 54 ft 2 in (16,510 mm)
- Height: ♠ 12 ft 10 in (3,912 mm) ♥♣ 12 ft 8 in (3,861 mm)
- Frame type: Bar
- Axle load: ♠ 11 LT 14 cwt (11,890 kg) ♥ 12 LT (12,190 kg) ♣ 12 LT 11 cwt (12,750 kg)
  - Leading: ♠ 12 LT 9 cwt (12,650 kg) ♥♣ 12 LT 15 cwt (12,950 kg)
  - Coupled: ♠ 11 LT 14 cwt (11,890 kg) ♥ 12 LT (12,190 kg)
  - 1st coupled: ♣ 11 LT 18 cwt (12,090 kg)
  - 2nd coupled: ♣ 12 LT 11 cwt (12,750 kg)
  - 3rd coupled: ♣ 11 LT 19 cwt (12,140 kg)
  - 4th coupled: ♣ 11 LT 18 cwt (12,090 kg)
  - Tender bogie: Bogie 1: ʘ 16 LT 15 cwt (17,020 kg) ʘ 20 LT 14 cwt (21,030 kg); Bogie 2: ʘ 17 LT 8 cwt (17,680 kg) ʘ 22 LT 7 cwt (22,710 kg)
  - Tender axle: ʘ 8 LT 14 cwt (8,840 kg) ♦ 9 LT 14 cwt 1 qtr (9,868 kg) av. ʘ 11 LT 3 cwt 2 qtr (11,350 kg)
- Adhesive weight: ♠ 46 LT 16 cwt (47,550 kg) ♥ 48 LT (48,770 kg) ♣ 48 LT 6 cwt (49,080 kg)
- Loco weight: ♠ 59 LT 5 cwt (60,200 kg) ♥ 60 LT 15 cwt (61,720 kg) ♣ 61 LT 1 cwt (62,030 kg)
- Tender weight: ʘ 34 LT 3 cwt (34,700 kg) ♦ 36 LT 18 cwt (37,490 kg) ʘ 43 LT 1 cwt (43,740 kg)
- Total weight: ♠ʘ 93 LT 8 cwt (94,900 kg) ♠♦ 96 LT 3 cwt (97,690 kg) ♠ʘ 102 LT 6 cwt (103,900 kg) ♥ʘ 94 LT 18 cwt (96,420 kg) ♥ʘ 103 LT 16 cwt (105,500 kg) ♣ʘ 95 LT 4 cwt (96,730 kg) ♣♦ 97 LT 19 cwt (99,520 kg)
- Tender type: ʘ XD (2-axle bogies) ♦ XE1 (2-axle bogies) ʘ XF (2-axle bogies); XC, XC1, XD, XE, XE1, XF, XF1, XF2, XJ, XM, XM1, XM2, XM3 permitted
- Fuel type: Coal
- Fuel capacity: ʘ 5 LT 10 cwt (5.6 t) ♦ʘ 10 LT (10.2 t)
- Water cap.: ʘ 2,730 imp gal (12,400 L) ♦ 2,855 imp gal (13,000 L) ʘ 3,000 imp gal (13,600 L)
- Firebox
  - Type: Round-top
  - Grate area: ♠ 21.35 sq ft (1.98 m^{2}) ♥♣ 21 sq ft (1.95 m^{2})
- Boiler
  - Pitch: ♠ 7 ft (2,134 mm) ♥♣ 7 ft 1 in (2,159 mm)
  - Diameter: 5 ft (1,524 mm)
  - Tube plates: ♠ 11 ft 1/2 in (3,366 mm) ♥♣ 11 ft 3/8 in (3,362 mm)
  - Small tubes: ♠ 205: 2 in (51 mm) ♥♣ 115: 2 in (51 mm)
  - Large tubes: ♥♣ 18: 5 1/2 in (140 mm)
- Boiler pressure: 180 psi (1,241 kPa)
- Safety valve: Ramsbottom
- Heating surface
  - Firebox: 131 sq ft (12.2 m^{2})
  - Tubes: ♠ 1,184 sq ft (110.0 m^{2}) ♥♣ 950 sq ft (88 m^{2})
  - Total surface: ♠ 1,315 sq ft (122.2 m^{2}) ♥♣ 1,081 sq ft (100.4 m^{2})
- Superheater
  - Heating area: ♥♣ 214 sq ft (19.9 m^{2})
- Cylinders: Two
- Cylinder size: ♠ 18 1/2 in (470 mm) bore ♥ 19 in (483 mm) bore ♣ 20 in (508 mm) bore ♠♥♣ 24 in (610 mm) stroke
- Valve gear: Stephenson
- Valve type: ♠ Slide – ♥♣ Piston
- Couplers: Johnston link-and-pin AAR knuckle (1930s)
Performance figures
- Tractive effort: ♠ 23,110 lbf (102.8 kN) @ 75% ♥ 24,370 lbf (108.4 kN) @ 75% ♣ 27,000 lbf (120 kN) @ 75%
Career
- Operators: Cape Government Railways; South African Railways
- Class: CGR 8th Class; SAR Classes 8 & 8W
- Number in class: 23
- Numbers: CGR 358-365, 771-782, 801-803; SAR 1069-1091
- Delivered: 1902–1903
- First run: 1902
- Withdrawn: 1972
- The leading coupled axle had flangeless wheels

The South African Railways Class 8 4-8-0 of 1902 was a steam locomotive from the pre-Union era in the Cape of Good Hope.

In 1902 and 1903, the Cape Government Railways placed 23 8th Class steam locomotives with a 4-8-0 Mastodon type wheel arrangement in service, three on the Cape Western System, eight on the Cape Midland System and twelve on the Cape Eastern System. In 1912, when they were assimilated into the South African Railways, they were renumbered, but retained their Class 8 classification.

== Manufacture ==
=== Evolution ===
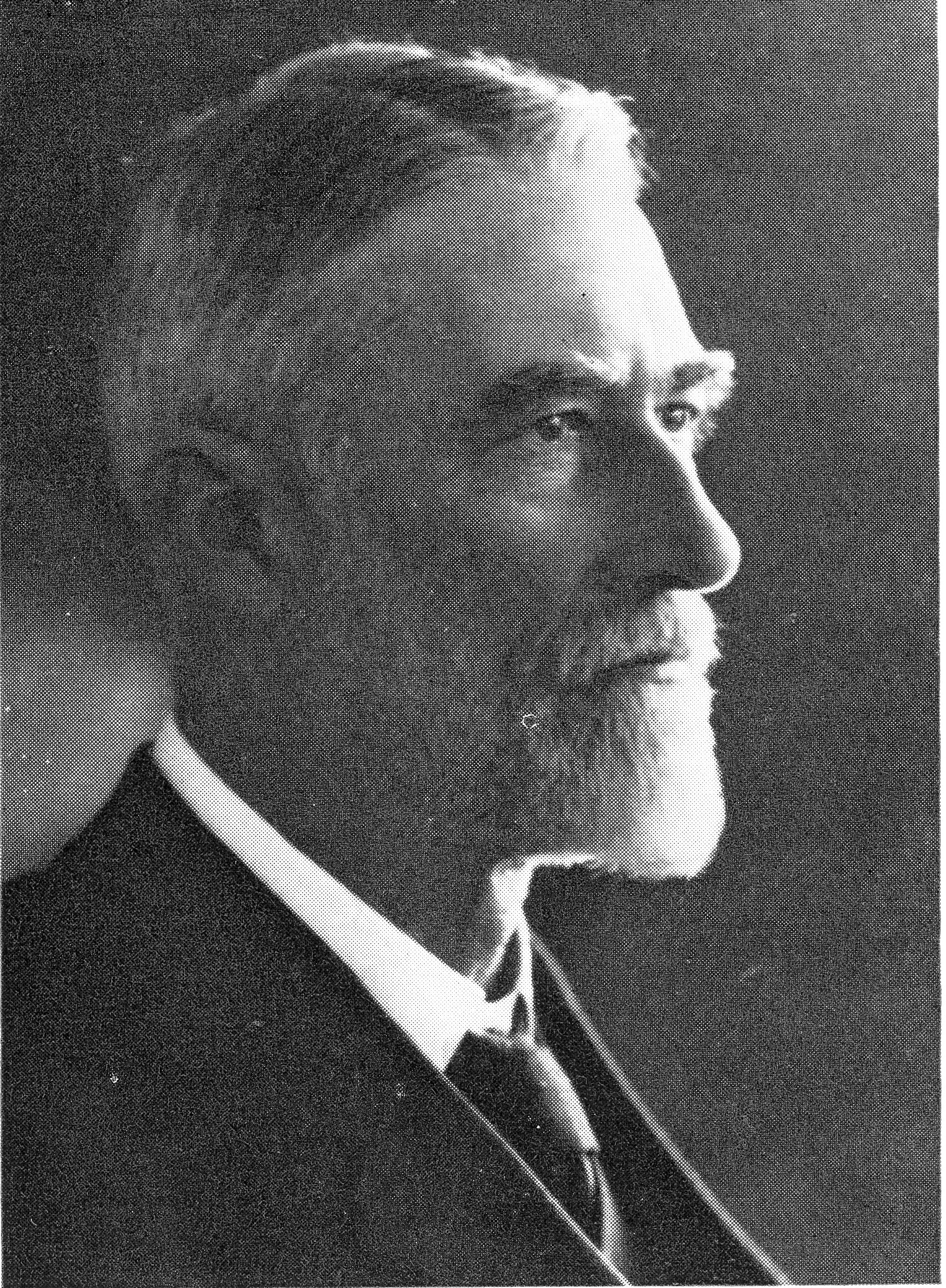
H.M. Beatty

The first 8th Class locomotives of the Cape Government Railways (CGR) were 2-8-0 Consolidation types, designed by H.M. Beatty, the Chief Locomotive Superintendent of the CGR from 1896 to 1910. They entered service in 1901 and were later to become the South African Railways (SAR) Class 8X.

While these first Schenectady and ALCO-built 2-8-0 locomotives were being subjected to exhaustive testing on all types of traffic and under varying conditions, some trouble was experienced with the leading two-wheeled pony truck. When designs were prepared at Salt River for a later order for more locomotives, the pony truck was replaced with a four-wheeled bogie and the coupled wheelbase was shortened from 14 feet 6 inches (4,420 millimetres) to 13 feet 6 inches (4,115 millimetres).

=== Manufacturer ===
The 23 locomotives of 1902 and 1903 were the first 8th Class locomotives of the CGR to be built with a 4-8-0 Mastodon type wheel arrangement. These locomotives were built by Neilson, Reid and Company in 1901 and 1902, and delivered in three batches in 1902 and 1903. In spite of the difference in wheel arrangement, these Mastodons and the earlier Consolidations of the CGR were all grouped together into the 8th Class.

They were conceived as mixed traffic locomotives, equally suitable for goods and passenger work. They had larger coupled wheels than the CGR 7th Class, bar frames, used saturated steam and had Stephenson valve gear. In service, it was found that the four-wheeled bogies and the 12 inches (305 millimetres) shorter fixed wheelbase made them steadier and easier riding than their 2-8-0 Consolidation predecessors.

=== Tenders ===
The first batch of three locomotives, numbered in the range from 801 to 803, went to the CGR's Western System in 1902. They were delivered with Type XD tenders which had a coal capacity of 5 long tons 10 hundredweight (5.6 tonnes) and a water capacity of 2,730 imperial gallons (12,400 litres).

Of the second batch of ten locomotives which arrived in 1902, eight were numbered in the range from 358 to 365 and allocated to the Midland System, while the other two became numbers 771 and 772, allocated to the Eastern System. These engines were delivered with Type XE1 tenders which had a coal capacity of 10 long tons (10.2 tonnes) and a water capacity of 2,855 imperial gallons (13,000 litres).

The last batch of ten locomotives, numbered in the range from 773 to 782, arrived in 1903 and all went to the Eastern System. These engines were delivered with Type XF tenders which also had a coal capacity of 10 long tons (10.2 tonnes), but a water capacity of 3,000 imperial gallons (13,600 litres).

== Class 8 sub-classes ==
When the Union of South Africa was established on 31 May 1910, the three Colonial government railways (CGR, Natal Government Railways and Central South African Railways) were united under a single administration to control and administer the railways, ports and harbours of the Union. Although the South African Railways and Harbours came into existence in 1910, the actual classification and renumbering of all the rolling stock of the three constituent railways were only implemented with effect from 1 January 1912.

When these 23 locomotives were assimilated into the South African Railways (SAR) in 1912, they were renumbered in the range from 1069 to 1091, but they retained their Class 8 classification.

The rest of the 8th Class Consolidations and Mastodons of the CGR, together with the Class 8-L1 to 8-L3 4-8-0 Mastodon locomotives of the Central South African Railways, were grouped into nine more different sub-classes by the SAR. The other 4-8-0 locomotives became SAR Classes 8A to 8F and the 2-8-0 locomotives became Classes 8X to 8Z.

== Modification ==
During A.G. Watson's term as Chief Mechanical Engineer of the SAR from 1929 to 1936, many of the Class 8 to Class 8F locomotives were equipped with superheated boilers, larger bore cylinders and either inside or outside admission piston valves. The outside admission locomotives had their cylinder bore increased from 18 1/2 inches (470 millimetres) to 19 inches (483 millimetres) and retained their existing SAR Class 8 classifications, while the inside admission locomotives had their cylinder bore increased to 20 inches (508 millimetres) and were reclassified by having a "W" suffix added to their existing SAR classification letters.

Of the Class 8 locomotives, five were equipped with superheated boilers, 19 inches (483 millimetres) bore cylinders and outside admission piston valves, while retaining their Class 8 classification.

Four locomotives were equipped with superheated boilers, 20 inches (508 millimetres) bore cylinders and inside admission piston valves and reclassified to Class 8W.

== Service ==
In SAR service, the Class 8 4-8-0 family of locomotives served on every system in the country and in the 1920s became the mainstay of motive power on many branch lines. From Volksrust in the Western Transvaal system, the Class 8 worked the 171-kilometre-long (106-mile) link line to Bethal for several decades until the end of the 1950s, initially sharing their duties with some versions of the Class 6 family. In their last decade at Volksrust until mid-1961 they were increasingly used on standby and shunting duties while the 1948 batch of North British-built Class 19D locomotives were phased in. By 1972, they were all withdrawn from service.

=== Preservation ===
Only one member of this class survives, Class 8 no. 1090 formerly Cape Government Railways Eastern no. 781 is preserved under ownership of TRANSnet at Louis Trichaart Station.

== Works numbers ==
The Class 8 and Class 8W works numbers, renumbering and superheating modifications are shown in the table.

Neilson, Reid-built Class 8 & 8W Works numbers, renumbering and modification
Year	Works No.	CGR No.	CGR System	SAR No.	SAR Model
1901	6111	801	Western	1069	
1901	6112	802	Western	1070	Superheated
1901	6113	803	Western	1071	
1902	6216	358	Midland	1072	
1902	6217	359	Midland	1073	Class 8W
1902	6218	360	Midland	1074	Class 8W
1902	6219	361	Midland	1075	
1902	6220	362	Midland	1076	
1902	6221	363	Midland	1077	Class 8W
1902	6222	364	Midland	1078	Class 8W
1902	6223	365	Midland	1079	
1902	6224	771	Eastern	1080	
1902	6225	772	Eastern	1081	
1902	6241	773	Eastern	1082	Superheated
1902	6242	774	Eastern	1083	
1902	6243	775	Eastern	1084	
1902	6244	776	Eastern	1085	Superheated
1902	6245	777	Eastern	1086	Superheated
1902	6246	778	Eastern	1087	
1902	6247	779	Eastern	1088	Superheated
1902	6248	780	Eastern	1089	
1902	6249	781	Eastern	1090	
1902	6250	782	Eastern	1091	

== Illustration ==
The main picture shows Class 8 no. 1088, ex CGR no. 779, at East London c. 1930, as built with slide valves, but with a rebuilt Type XF tender. The following pictures serve to illustrate the original slide valve configuration and the modified piston valve and superheating configuration.

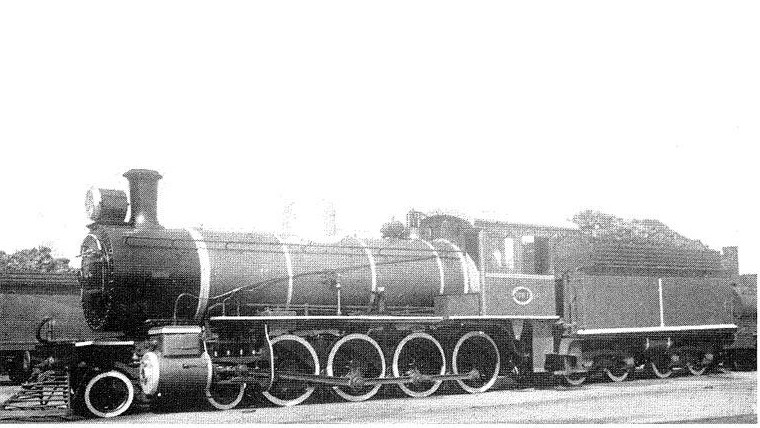
Ex CGR Eastern System no. 778, SAR no. 1087, as built without superheating, c. 1930

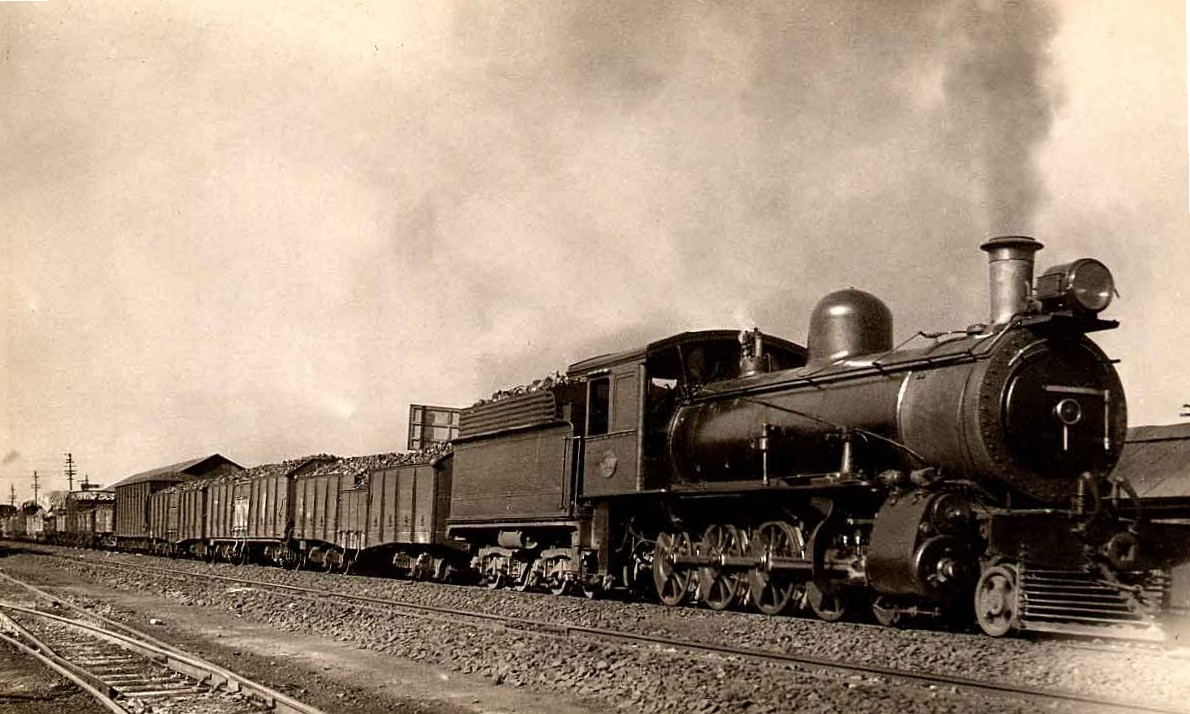
Superheated Class 8 with outside admission piston valves at Braamfontein, c. 1930
