= South African type XC tender =

Steam locomotive tender in South Africa

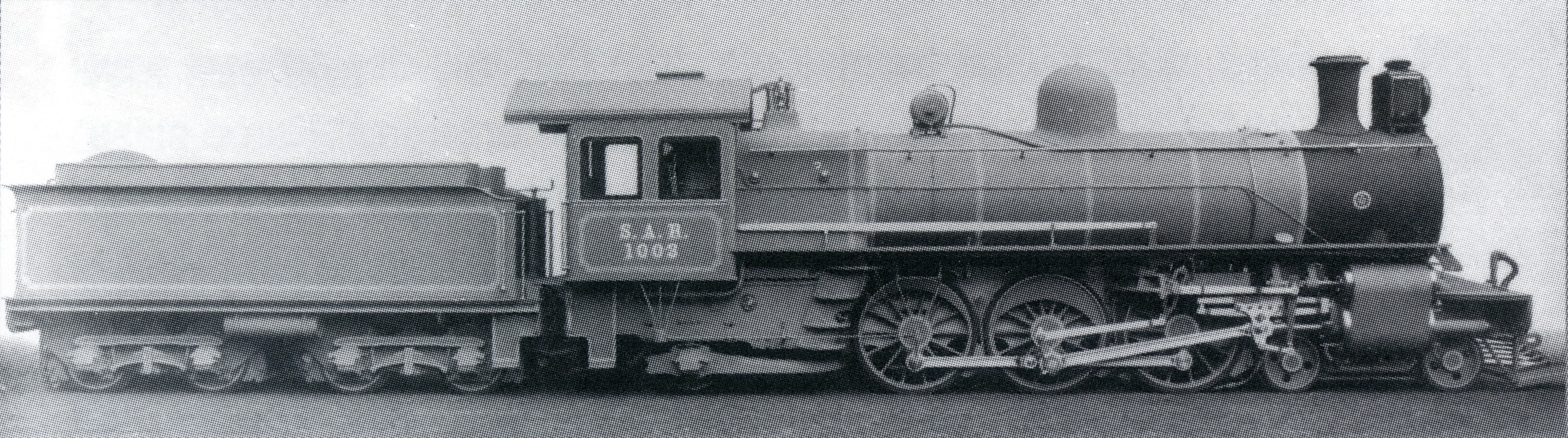
- Type XC tender on CSAR Class 10-C
Type and origin
- Locomotive: CSAR Class 10-C
- Designer: Central South African Railways (G.G. Elliot)
- Builder: North British Locomotive Company
- In service: 1910-1911
- Rebuilder: South African Railways
- Rebuild date: c. 1925
- Rebuilt to: Type XF
Specifications
- Configuration: 2-axle bogies
- Gauge: 3 ft 6 in (1,067 mm) Cape gauge
- Length: 22 ft 3 1/8 in (6,785 mm)
- Wheel dia.: 33 1/2 in (851 mm) as built 34 in (864 mm) retyred
- Wheelbase: 14 ft 7 in (4,445 mm)
  - Bogie: 4 ft 7 in (1,397 mm)
- Axle load: 8 LT 18 cwt (9,043 kg)
  - Front bogie: 17 LT (17,270 kg)
  - Rear bogie: 17 LT 16 cwt (18,090 kg)
- Weight empty: 38,960 lb (17,670 kg)
- Weight w/o: 34 LT 16 cwt (35,360 kg)
- Fuel type: Coal
- Fuel cap.: 5 LT (5.1 t)
- Water cap.: 2,600 imp gal (11,800 L)
- Stoking: Manual
- Couplers: Drawbar & Johnston link-and-pin
Career
- Operators: Central South African Railways; South African Railways
- Numbers: SAR 767-778

The South African type XC tender was a steam locomotive tender from the pre-Union era in Transvaal.

The Type XC tender entered service in 1910 and 1911, as tenders to the Class 10-C 4-6-2 Pacific type steam locomotives which were acquired by the Central South African Railways. These locomotives were designated Class 10C on the South African Railways in 1912.

== Manufacturer ==
Twelve Type XC tenders were built in 1910 by the North British Locomotive Company (NBL).

The Central South African Railways (CSAR) placed twelve Class 10-C Pacific type locomotives in service in 1911 and 1912. The locomotive and tender were designed in 1910 by G.G. Elliot, Chief Mechanical Engineer of the CSAR, at its Pretoria works.

The Type XC entered service as tenders to these locomotives, which were acquired for light passenger working on the Reef.

== Characteristics ==
The tender had a maximum axle load of 8 long tons 18 hundredweight (9,043 kilograms), a coal capacity of 5 long tons (5.1 tonnes) and a water capacity of 2,600 imperial gallons (11,800 litres; 3,120 US gallons).

== Locomotive ==
Only the Class 10C locomotives were delivered new with Type XC tenders. In the South African Railways (SAR) years, tenders were numbered for the engines they were delivered with. In most cases, an oval number plate, bearing the engine number and often also the locomotive class and tender type, would be attached to the rear end of the tender. During the classification and renumbering of locomotives onto the SAR roster in 1912, no separate classification and renumbering list was published for tenders, which should have been renumbered according to the locomotive renumbering list. Bearing in mind that tenders could and did migrate between engines, these tenders should have been numbered in the SAR number range from 767 to 778.

== Classification letters ==
Since many tender types are interchangeable between different locomotive classes and types, a tender classification system was adopted by the SAR. The first letter of the tender type indicates the classes of engines to which it can be coupled. The "X_" tenders could be used with the locomotive classes as shown.

- Cape Government Railways Mountain, SAR Class 4.
- SAR Class 4A.
- SAR Class 5.
- Cape Government Railways 6th Class of 1897, SAR Class 6B.
- Oranje-Vrijstaat Gouwerment-Spoorwegen 6th Class L3, SAR Class 6E.
- Cape Government Railways 6th Class of 1901 (Neilson, Reid), SAR Class 6H.
- Cape Government Railways 6th Class of 1902, SAR Class 6J.
- Cape Government Railways 8th Class of 1902, SAR Class 8.
- Imperial Military Railways 8th Class, SAR Class 8A.
- CSAR Class 8-L2, SAR Class 8B.
- CSAR Class 8-L3, SAR Class 8C.
- Cape Government Railways 8th Class 4-8-0 of 1903, SAR Class 8D.
- Cape Government Railways 8th Class Experimental, SAR Class 8E.
- Cape Government Railways 8th Class 4-8-0 of 1904, SAR Class 8F.
- Cape Government Railways 8th Class 2-8-0 of 1903, SAR Class 8Y.
- Cape Government Railways 8th Class 2-8-0 of 1904, SAR Class 8Z.
- CSAR Class 9, SAR Class 9.
- CSAR Class 10, SAR Class 10.
- CSAR Class 10-2 Saturated, SAR Class 10A.
- CSAR Class 10-2 Superheated. SAR Class 10B.
- CSAR Class 10-C, SAR Class 10C.
- CSAR Class 11, SAR Class 11.
- Cape Government Railways 9th Class of 1903, SAR Class Experimental 4.
- Cape Government Railways 9th Class of 1906, SAR Class Experimental 5.
- Cape Government Railways 10th Class, SAR Class Experimental 6.
- SAR Class ME.
- CSAR Mallet Superheated, SAR Class MF.

The second letter indicates the tender's water capacity. The "_C" tenders had a capacity of between 2,590 and 2,600 imperial gallons (11,770 and 11,820 litres; 3,110 and 3,122 US gallons).

A number, when added after the letter code, indicates differences between similar tender types, such as function, wheelbase or coal bunker capacity.

== Rebuilding ==
The Class 10C locomotives were soon found to be capable of handling mainline passenger trains and they were therefore equipped with new and larger Type XM2 tenders.

From c. 1925, the redundant Type XC tenders were completely rebuilt by the SAR by mounting a completely new upper structure on the existing underframe, with new water tanks and a larger coal capacity. These rebuilt tenders had a more modern appearance, with flush sides all the way to the top of the coal bunker. They had a coal capacity of 10 long tons (10.2 tonnes), a water capacity of 3,000 imperial gallons (13,600 litres) and a maximum axle load of 11 long tons 3 hundredweight 2 quarters (11,350 kilograms). They were reclassified as Type XF.

The program to rebuild several older tender types with new upper structures was begun by Col F.R. Collins DSO, who approved several of the detailed drawings for the work during his term in office as Chief Mechanical Engineer of the SAR from 1922 to 1929. It was continued by his successor, A.G. Watson.

== Illustration ==
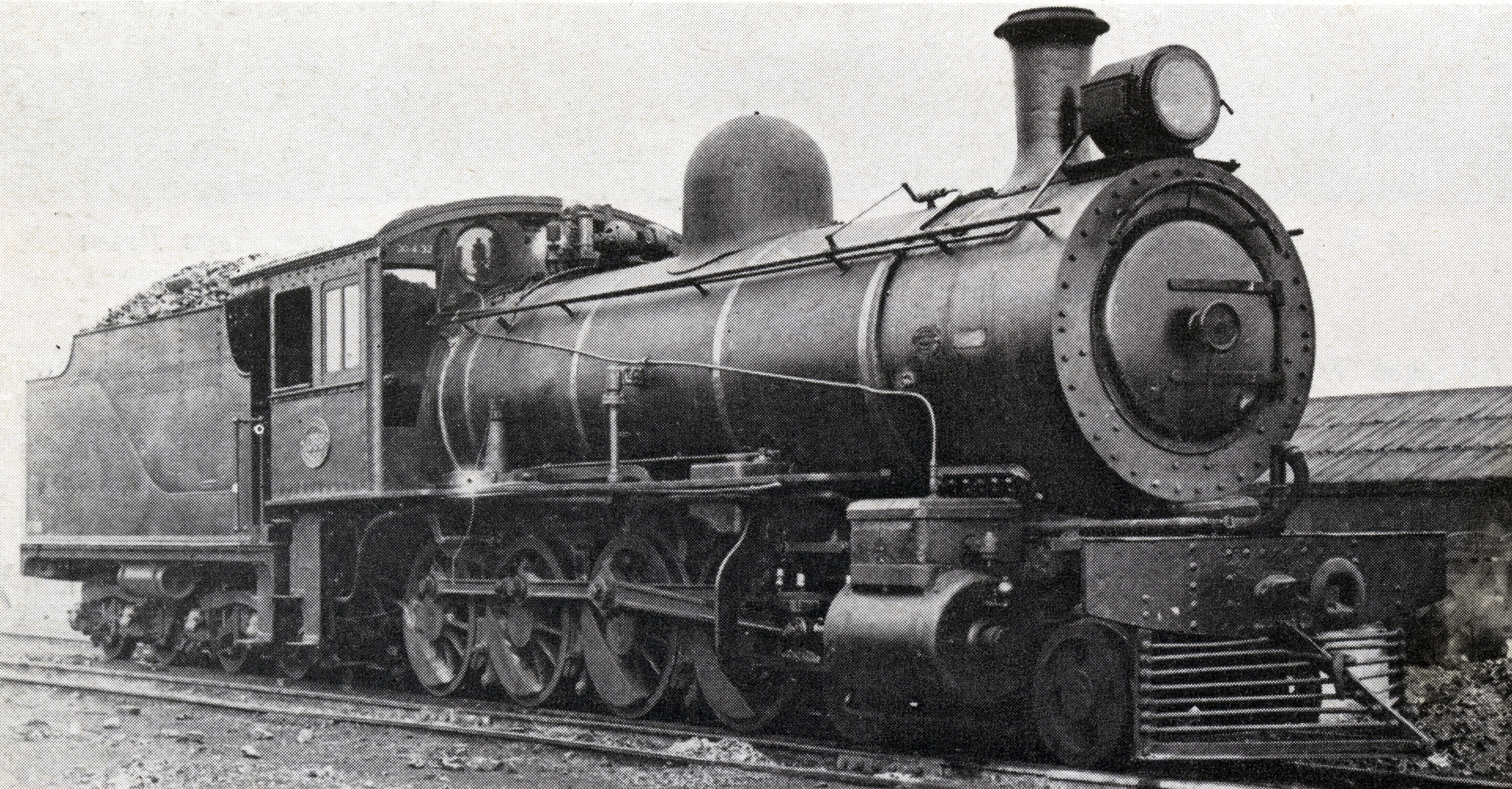
Rebuilt flush-sided Type XF tender with 10 long tons (10.2 tonnes) coal capacity on Class 8, c. 1930
