= South African type XF1 tender =

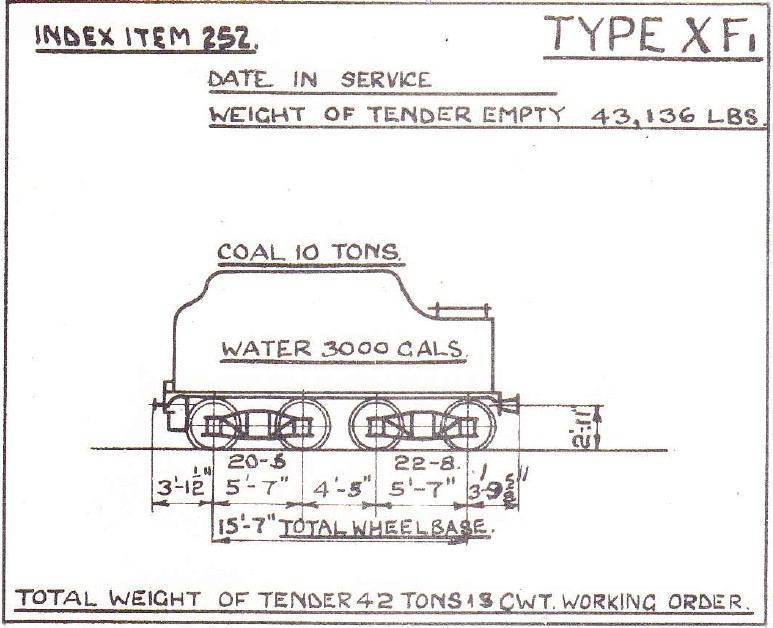
- SAR dimensional drawing
Type and origin
- Designer: South African Railways
- Builder: South African Railways
- In service: c. 1925
Specifications
- Configuration: 2-axle bogies
- Gauge: 3 ft 6 in (1,067 mm) Cape gauge
- Length: 22 ft 6 1/8 in (6,861 mm)
- Bogies: Diamond frame
- Wheel dia.: 34 in (864 mm)
- Wheelbase: 15 ft 7 in (4,750 mm)
  - Bogie: 5 ft 7 in (1,702 mm)
- Axle load: 11 LT 4 cwt (11,380 kg)
  - Front bogie: 20 LT 5 cwt (20,570 kg)
  - Rear bogie: 22 LT 8 cwt (22,760 kg)
- Weight empty: 43,136 lb (19,566 kg)
- Weight w/o: 42 LT 15 cwt (43,440 kg)
- Fuel type: Coal
- Fuel cap.: 10 LT (10.2 t)
- Water cap.: 3,000 imp gal (13,600 L)
- Stoking: Manual
- Couplers: Drawbar & Johnston link-and-pin Drawbar & AAR knuckle (1930s)
Career
- Operators: South African Railways
- Numbers: SAR N37-N46

The South African type XF1 tender was a steam locomotive tender.

Ten Type XF1 tenders were built as spare tenders by the South African Railways during the 1920s. They were apparently not allocated to or built for any particular class of locomotive, but were suitable for use with a wide variety of serving engines.

== Manufacturers ==
During the 1920s, ten Type XF1 tenders were built as spare tenders by the South African Railways (SAR).

== Characteristics ==
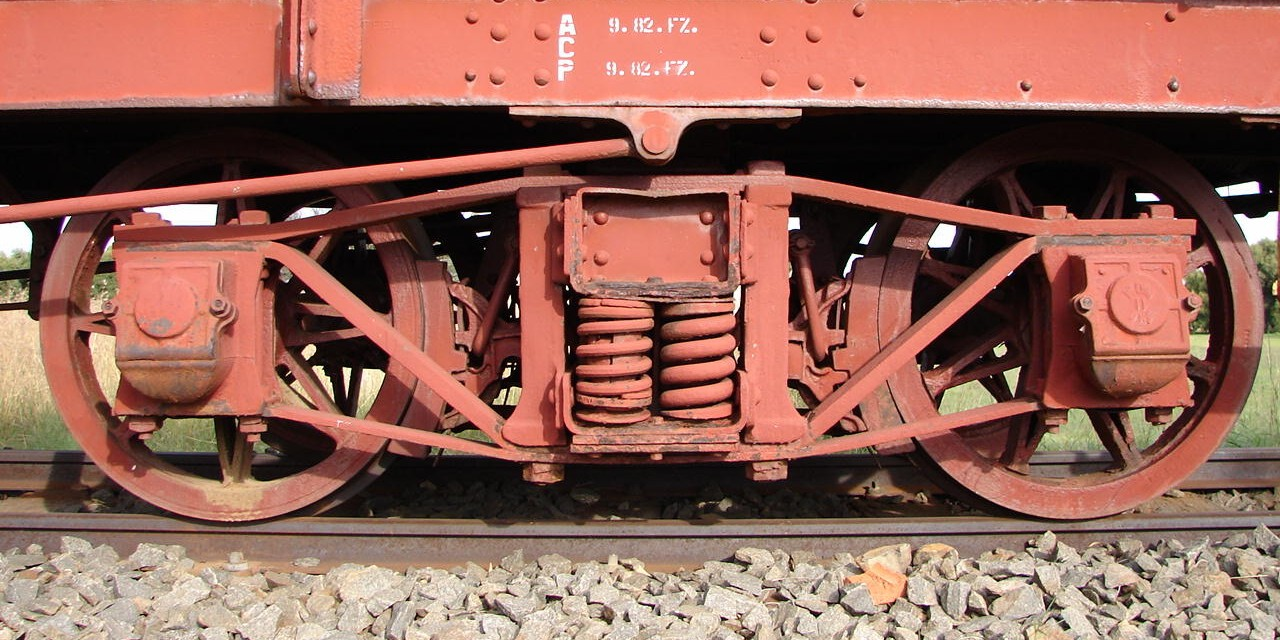
Diamond Frame bogie

These tenders had a modern appearance, with flush sides all the way to the top of the coal bunker. They were very similar in appearance to those Type XF tenders which had been rebuilt by the SAR by mounting a completely new upper structure on the existing underframes. They had the same water capacity of 3,000 imperial gallons (13,600 litres) and coal capacity of 10 long tons (10.2 tonnes) as the Type XF, but rode on diamond frame bogies with a 12 inches (305 millimetres) longer wheelbase per bogie.

== Locomotives ==
Tenders were usually numbered for the engines they were delivered with. The ten Type XF1 tenders were built as spare tenders, suitable for use with a wide variety of serving engines, and were therefore not numbered for specific engines but in the tender number range from N37 to N46. The "N" number prefixes usually indicated non-revenue earning vehicles.

== Classification letters ==
Since many tender types are interchangeable between different locomotive classes and types, a tender classification system was adopted by the SAR. The first letter of the tender type indicates the classes of engines to which it can be coupled. The "X_" tenders could be used with the following locomotive classes:

- Cape Government Railways Mountain, SAR Class 4.
- SAR Class 4A.
- SAR Class 5.
- Cape Government Railways 6th Class of 1897, SAR Class 6B.
- Oranje-Vrijstaat Gouwerment-Spoorwegen 6th Class L3, SAR Class 6E.
- Cape Government Railways 6th Class of 1901 (Neilson, Reid), SAR Class 6H.
- Cape Government Railways 6th Class of 1902, SAR Class 6J.
- Cape Government Railways 8th Class of 1902, SAR Class 8.
- Imperial Military Railways 8th Class, SAR Class 8A.
- Central South African Railways Class 8-L2, SAR Class 8B.
- Central South African Railways Class 8-L3, SAR Class 8C.
- Cape Government Railways 8th Class 4-8-0 of 1903, SAR Class 8D.
- Cape Government Railways 8th Class Experimental, SAR Class 8E.
- Cape Government Railways 8th Class 4-8-0 of 1904, SAR Class 8F.
- Cape Government Railways 8th Class 2-8-0 of 1903, SAR Class 8Y.
- Cape Government Railways 8th Class 2-8-0 of 1904, SAR Class 8Z.
- Central South African Railways Class 9, SAR Class 9.
- Central South African Railways Class 10, SAR Class 10.
- Central South African Railways Class 10-2 Saturated, SAR Class 10A.
- Central South African Railways Class 10-2 Superheated. SAR Class 10B.
- Central South African Railways Class 10-C, SAR Class 10C.
- Central South African Railways Class 11, SAR Class 11.
- Cape Government Railways 9th Class of 1903, SAR Class Experimental 4.
- Cape Government Railways 9th Class of 1906, SAR Class Experimental 5.
- Cape Government Railways 10th Class, SAR Class Experimental 6.
- SAR Class ME.
- Central South African Railways Mallet Superheated, SAR Class MF.

The second letter indicates the tender's water capacity. The "_F" tenders had a capacity of 3,000 imperial gallons (13,600 litres; 3,600 US gallons).

A number, when added after the letter code, indicates differences between similar tender types, such as function, wheelbase or coal bunker capacity.
