= South African Class 6E 4-6-0 =

1898 design of steam locomotive

OVGS 6th Class L3 4-6-0 CSAR Class 6-L3 4-6-0 South African Class 6E 4-6-0
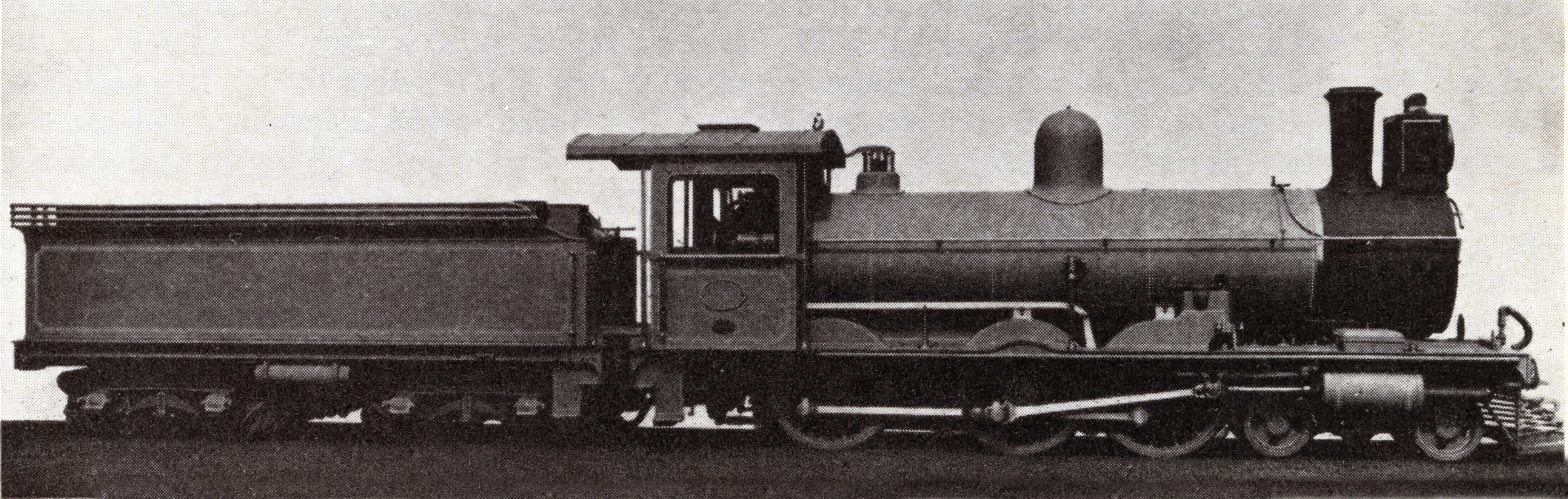
- OVGS 6th Class L3, CSAR Class 6-L3, SAR Class 6E
Type and origin
- ♠ – Original locomotive, as built ♥ – Locomotive rebuilt with Belpaire firebox
- Power type: Steam
- Designer: Cape Government Railways (H.M. Beatty)
- Builder: Sharp, Stewart and Company
- Serial number: 4464–4469
- Model: CGR 6th Class
- Build date: 1898
- Total produced: 6
Specifications
- Configuration
  - Whyte: 4-6-0 (Tenwheeler)
  - UIC: 2'Cn2
- Driver: 2nd coupled axle
- Gauge: 3 ft 6 in (1,067 mm) Cape gauge
- Leading dia.: 28 1/2 in (724 mm)
- Coupled dia.: 54 in (1,372 mm)
- Tender wheels: 33 1/2 in (851 mm) as built 34 in (864 mm) retyred
- Wheelbase: 46 ft 11 in (14,300 mm)
  - Axle spacing (Asymmetrical): 1-2: 4 ft 9 in (1,448 mm); 2-3: 6 ft 3 in (1,905 mm)
  - Engine: 20 ft 3 3/4 in (6,191 mm)
  - Leading: 5 ft 5 1/2 in (1,664 mm)
  - Coupled: 11 ft 4 in (3,454 mm)
  - Tender: 16 ft 1 in (4,902 mm)
  - Tender bogie: 4 ft 7 in (1,397 mm)
- Length
  - Over couplers: 54 ft 5 1/4 in (16,593 mm)
- Height: ♠ 12 ft 10 in (3,912 mm) ♥ 12 ft 10 3/8 in (3,921 mm)
- Frame type: Plate
- Axle load: ♠ 11 LT 17 cwt (12,040 kg) ♥ 13 LT 8 cwt (13,620 kg)
  - Leading: ♠ 11 LT 8 cwt (11,580 kg) ♥ 10 LT 17 cwt 2 qtr (11,050 kg)
  - Coupled: ♥ 13 LT 8 cwt (13,620 kg)
  - 1st coupled: ♠ 11 LT 15 cwt (11,940 kg)
  - 2nd coupled: ♠ 11 LT 17 cwt (12,040 kg)
  - 3rd coupled: ♠ 11 LT 15 cwt 2 qtr (11,960 kg)
  - Tender bogie: Bogie 1: 16 LT 12 cwt (16,870 kg); Bogie 2: 17 LT 13 cwt (17,930 kg)
  - Tender axle: 8 LT 16 cwt 2 qtr (8,967 kg)
- Adhesive weight: ♠ 35 LT 7 cwt 2 qtr (35,940 kg) ♥ 40 LT 4 cwt (40,850 kg)
- Loco weight: ♠ 46 LT 15 cwt 2 qtr (47,530 kg) ♥ 51 LT 1 cwt 2 qtr (51,890 kg)
- Tender weight: 34 LT 5 cwt (34,800 kg)
- Total weight: ♠ 81 LT 0 cwt 2 qtr (82,330 kg) ♥ 85 LT 6 cwt 2 qtr (86,690 kg)
- Tender type: XC1 (2-axle bogies); XC, XC1, XD, XE, XE1, XF, XF1, XF2, XJ, XM, XM1, XM2, XM3 permitted
- Fuel type: Coal
- Fuel capacity: 5 LT 10 cwt (5.6 t)
- Water cap.: 2,600 imp gal (11,820 L)
- Firebox
  - Type: ♠ Round-top – ♥ Belpaire
  - Grate area: ♠♥ 16.6 sq ft (1.54 m^{2})
- Boiler
  - Pitch: ♠ 6 ft 8 in (2,032 mm) ♥ 7 ft (2,134 mm)
  - Diameter: ♠ 4 ft 4 in (1,321 mm) ♥ 4 ft 9 in (1,448 mm)
  - Tube plates: ♠♥ 11 ft 2 1/8 in (3,407 mm)
  - Small tubes: ♠ 185: 1 7/8 in (48 mm) ♥ 220: 2 in (51 mm)
- Boiler pressure: ♠ 160 psi (1,103 kPa) ♥ 180 psi (1,241 kPa)
- Safety valve: Ramsbottom
- Heating surface
  - Firebox: ♠ 101 sq ft (9.4 m^{2}) ♥ 111 sq ft (10.3 m^{2})
  - Tubes: ♠ 1,015 sq ft (94.3 m^{2}) ♥ 1,287.5 sq ft (119.61 m^{2})
  - Total surface: ♠ 1,116 sq ft (103.7 m^{2}) ♥ 1,398.5 sq ft (129.92 m^{2})
- Cylinders: Two
- Cylinder size: 17 in (432 mm) bore 26 in (660 mm) stroke
- Valve gear: Stephenson
- Valve type: Slide
- Couplers: Johnston link-and-pin AAR knuckle (1930s)
Performance figures
- Tractive effort: ♠ 16,690 lbf (74.2 kN) @ 75% ♥ 18,780 lbf (83.5 kN) @ 75%
Career
- Operators: OVGS; Imperial Military Railways; Central South African Railways; South African Railways
- Class: OVGS & IMR 6th Class L3; CSAR Class 6-L3; SAR Class 6E
- Number in class: 6
- Numbers: OVGS 96-98, IMR 370-372, CSAR 333-335 & 370-372, SAR 598-603
- Delivered: 1898
- First run: 1898

The South African Railways Class 6E 4-6-0 of 1898 was a steam locomotive from the pre-Union era in the Orange Free State.

In 1898, the Oranje-Vrijstaat Gouwerment-Spoorwegen ordered its final six new Cape 6th Class locomotives. When British forces invaded the Orange Free State during the Second Boer War, these locomotives were taken over by the Imperial Military Railways. After the war, they were renumbered into the Central South African Railways roster. In 1912, when they were assimilated into the South African Railways, they were renumbered and designated Class 6E.

== Manufacturer ==
The original 6th Class 4-6-0 passenger steam locomotive was designed at the Salt River works of the Cape Government Railways (CGR) at the same time as the 7th Class, both according to the specifications of Michael Stephens, then the Chief Locomotive Superintendent of the CGR, and under the supervision of H.M. Beatty, then the Locomotive Superintendent of the Cape Western System.

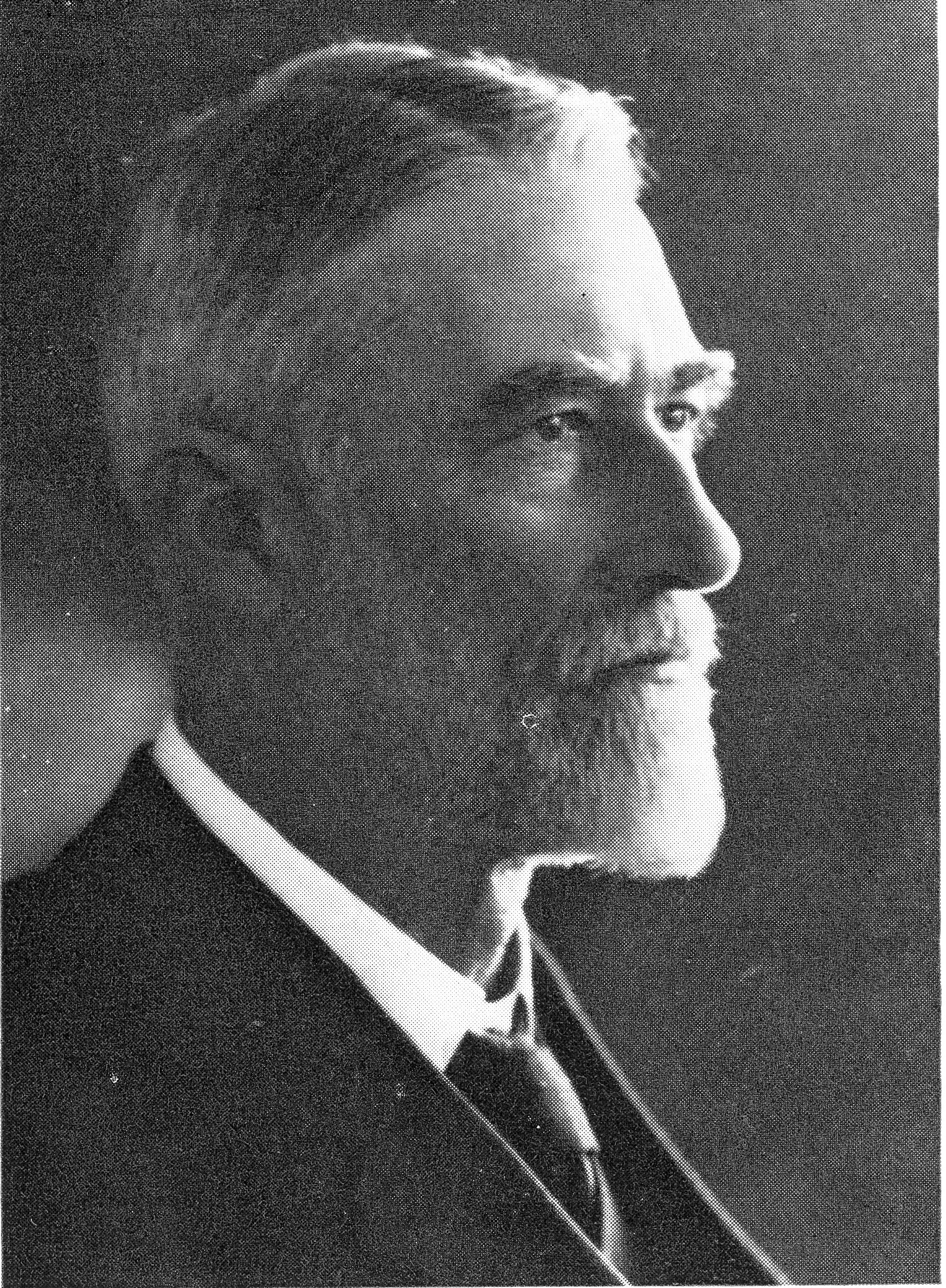
H.M. Beatty

The first ten 6th Class L locomotives of the Oranje-Vrijstaat Gouwerment-Spoorwegen (OVGS) were purchased second-hand from the CGR. These were followed by orders for 24 new 6th Class L2 locomotives, directly from the manufacturers, which were delivered between 1895 and 1898.

A final order for six more locomotives was placed with Sharp, Stewart and Company in 1898. Three of these engines, designated 6th Class L3, had been delivered and numbered in the range from 96 to 98 on the OVGS roster, when British forces invaded the Orange Free State during the Second Boer War and the OVGS was taken over by the Imperial Military Railways (IMR). When the other three locomotives arrived, they were therefore numbered in the range from 370 to 372 on the IMR roster.

These six locomotives were delivered with larger cabs than their predecessors and with Type XC1 bogie-wheeled tenders. The first three engines retained their OVGS numbers until the war ended in 1902, when they were renumbered onto the Central South African Railways (CSAR) roster. The other three locomotives retained their IMR running numbers on the CSAR and all six were designated CSAR Class 6-L3.

== Class 6 sub-classes ==
When the Union of South Africa was established on 31 May 1910, the three Colonial government railways (CGR, Natal Government Railways and CSAR) were united under a single administration to control and administer the railways, ports and harbours of the Union. Although the South African Railways and Harbours came into existence in 1910, the actual classification and renumbering of all the rolling stock of the three constituent railways were only implemented with effect from 1 January 1912.

When these six locomotives were assimilated into the South African Railways (SAR) in 1912, they were designated Class 6E and renumbered in the range from 598 to 603. These engines, together with the CGR's fleet of various types of 6th Class locomotives and the Class 6-L1 and 6-L2 locomotives which had been inherited by the CSAR from the OVGS via the IMR, were grouped into altogether fourteen sub-classes by the SAR. The 4-6-0 locomotives became SAR Classes 6, 6A to 6H and 6J to 6L, the 2-6-2 locomotives became Class 6Y and the 2-6-4 locomotives became Class 6Z.

== Modifications ==
P.A. Hyde, the Chief Locomotive Superintendent of the CSAR from 1902 to 1904, considered the 6th Class as "about the best design for their weight ever made". Several of the CSAR's Classes 6-L1 to 6-L3 locomotives were modified by Hyde by having their round-topped fireboxes replaced with larger boilers and Belpaire fireboxes. This conversion improved their performance tremendously, to the extent that they could be used in place of the 8th Class where they were formerly outclassed by load. This represented an increase in hauling capacity of some 12%, while their coal consumption was reduced by some 5%. The three Class 6E locomotives which were renumbered in the SAR range from 601 to 603, had undergone this modification.

During the 1930s, many of them were modified once again, when the Chief Mechanical Engineer of the SAR at the time, A.G. Watson, embarked on his program of standardisation and reboilered them with round-topped fireboxes once again, but without changing their classification.

== Renumbering ==
The Class 6E locomotives were renumbered twice, first from the OVGS and IMR rosters onto the CSAR roster and, in 1912, onto the SAR roster. The table lists their renumbering as well as their builder's works numbers.

Class 6E 4-6-0 Works numbers and renumbering
Works no.	OVGS no.	IMR no.	CSAR no.	SAR no.
4464	96		333	601
4465	97		334	598
4466	98		335	599
4467		370	370	600
4468		371	371	602
4469		372	372	603
