= South African type XM1 tender =

Steam locomotive tender in South Africa

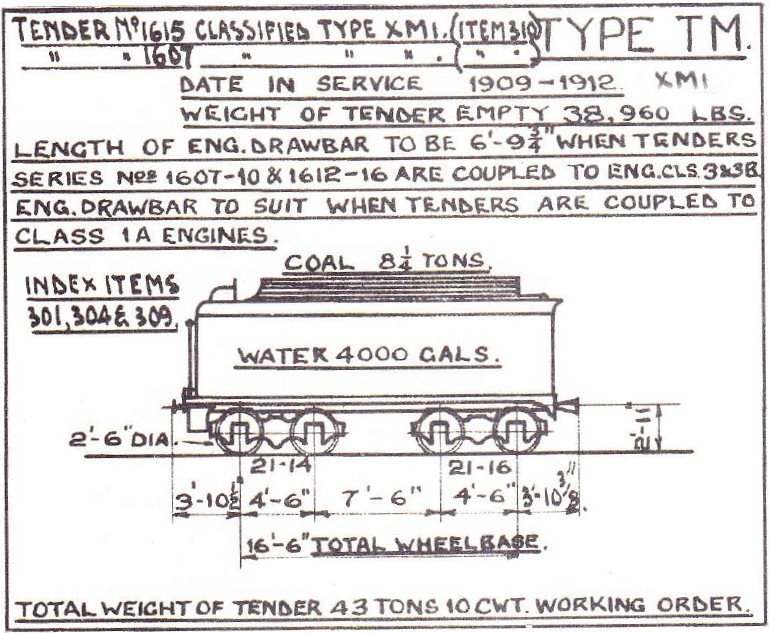
- SAR dimensional drawing
Type and origin
- Locomotive: SAR Class MC
- Designer: Natal Government Railways (D.A. Hendrie)
- Builder: North British Locomotive Co.
- Rebuilt from: Type TM
- Rebuilder: South African Railways
- Rebuild date: c. 1930
Specifications
- Configuration: 2-axle bogies
- Gauge: 3 ft 6 in (1,067 mm) Cape gauge
- Length: 24 ft 2 7/8 in (7,388 mm)
- Wheel dia.: 30 in (762 mm)
- Wheelbase: 16 ft 6 in (5,029 mm)
  - Bogie: 4 ft 6 in (1,372 mm)
- Axle load: 10 LT 18 cwt (11,070 kg)
  - Front bogie: 21 LT 14 cwt (22,050 kg)
  - Rear bogie: 21 LT 16 cwt (22,150 kg)
- Weight empty: 38,960 lb (17,670 kg)
- Weight w/o: 43 LT 10 cwt (44,200 kg)
- Fuel type: Coal
- Fuel cap.: 8 LT 5 cwt (8.4 t)
- Water cap.: 4,000 imp gal (18,200 L)
- Stoking: Manual
- Couplers: Drawbar & Johnston link-and-pin Drawbar & AAR knuckle (1930s)
Career
- Operators: South African Railways
- Numbers: SAR 1607, 1615

The South African type XM1 tender was a steam locomotive tender.

Type XM1 tenders were Type TM tenders which were reclassified after their intermediate draw and buffing gear were altered to an "X_" tender configuration. They first entered service in 1912, as tenders to the SAR Class MC 2-6-6-0 Denver type Mallet locomotive.

== Origin ==
Type TM tenders were built between 1910 and 1912 by the North British Locomotive Company (NBL). The two Type XM1 tenders originally entered service on the South African Railways (SAR) in 1912, as Type TM tenders to Class MC 2-6-6-0 Denver type Mallet locomotives.

== Rebuilding ==
At some stage before 1941, the intermediate draw and buffing gear of two of the tenders, numbers 1607 and 1615, were altered to an "X_" tender configuration. These two tenders were reclassified to Type XM1.

== Characteristics ==
The tender had a coal capacity of 8 long tons 5 hundredweight (8.4 tonnes) and a water capacity of 4,000 imperial gallons (18,200 litres), with a maximum axle load of 10 long tons 18 hundredweight (11,070 kilograms).

== Classification letters ==
Since many tender types are interchangeable between different locomotive classes and types, a tender classification system was adopted by the SAR. The first letter of the tender type indicates the classes of engines to which it could be coupled. The "X_" tenders could be used with the following locomotive classes:

- Cape Government Railways Mountain, SAR Class 4.
- SAR Class 4A.
- SAR Class 5.
- Cape Government Railways 6th Class of 1897, SAR Class 6B.
- Oranje-Vrijstaat Gouwerment-Spoorwegen (OVGS) 6th Class L3, SAR Class 6E.
- Cape Government Railways 6th Class of 1901 (Neilson, Reid), SAR Class 6H.
- Cape Government Railways 6th Class of 1902, SAR Class 6J.
- Cape Government Railways 8th Class of 1902, SAR Class 8.
- Imperial Military Railways (IMR) 8th Class, SAR Class 8A.
- Central South African Railways Class 8-L2, SAR Class 8B.
- Central South African Railways Class 8-L3, SAR Class 8C.
- Cape Government Railways 8th Class 4-8-0 of 1903, SAR Class 8D.
- Cape Government Railways 8th Class Experimental, SAR Class 8E.
- Cape Government Railways 8th Class 4-8-0 of 1904, SAR Class 8F.
- Cape Government Railways 8th Class 2-8-0 of 1903, SAR Class 8Y.
- Cape Government Railways 8th Class 2-8-0 of 1904, SAR Class 8Z.
- Central South African Railways Class 9, SAR Class 9.
- Central South African Railways Class 10, SAR Class 10.
- Central South African Railways Class 10-2 Saturated, SAR Class 10A.
- Central South African Railways Class 10-2 Superheated. SAR Class 10B.
- Central South African Railways Class 10-C, SAR Class 10C.
- Central South African Railways Class 11, SAR Class 11.
- Cape Government Railways 9th Class of 1903, SAR Class Experimental 4.
- Cape Government Railways 9th Class of 1906, SAR Class Experimental 5.
- Cape Government Railways 10th Class, SAR Class Experimental 6.
- SAR Class ME.
- Central South African Railways Mallet Superheated, SAR Class MF.

The second letter indicates the tender's water capacity. The "_M" tenders had a capacity of 4,000 imperial gallons (18,200 litres; 4,800 US gallons).

A number, when added after the letter code, indicates differences between similar tender types such as function, wheelbase or coal bunker capacity.
