= South African Class 8E 4-8-0 =

1903 design of steam locomotive

CGR 8th Class 4-8-0 1903 Experimental South African Class 8E 4-8-0
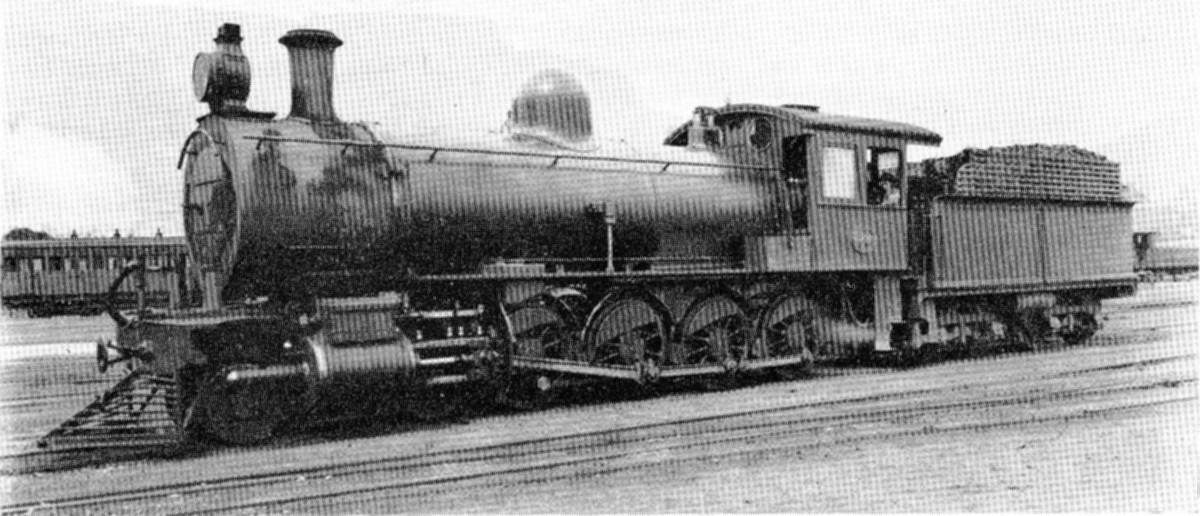
- CGR 8th Class no. 814, SAR Class 8E no. 1231
Type and origin
- ♠ - Original locomotive, as built ♥ - Locomotive equipped with superheating
- Power type: Steam
- Designer: Cape Government Railways (H.M. Beatty)
- Builder: Neilson, Reid and Company
- Serial number: 6309-6312
- Model: CGR 8th
- Build date: 1903
- Total produced: 4
Specifications
- Configuration
  - Whyte: 4-8-0 (Mastodon)
  - UIC: ♠ 2'Dn2 - ♥ 2'Dh2
- Driver: 2nd coupled axle
- Gauge: 3 ft 6 in (1,067 mm) Cape gauge
- Leading dia.: 28 1/2 in (724 mm)
- Coupled dia.: 48 in (1,219 mm)
- Tender wheels: 33 1/2 in (851 mm) as built 34 in (864 mm) retyred
- Wheelbase: 46 ft 10 1/2 in (14,288 mm)
  - Engine: 23 ft 3 in (7,087 mm)
  - Leading: 6 ft (1,829 mm)
  - Coupled: 13 ft 6 in (4,115 mm)
  - Tender: 14 ft 7 in (4,445 mm)
  - Tender bogie: 4 ft 7 in (1,397 mm)
- Length
  - Over couplers: ♠ 54 ft 2 1/4 in (16,516 mm) ♥ 54 ft 5 1/8 in (16,589 mm)
- Height: 12 ft 10 in (3,912 mm)
- Frame type: Bar
- Axle load: ♠ 11 LT 14 cwt (11,890 kg) ♥ 12 LT (12,190 kg)
  - Leading: ♠ 12 LT 9 cwt (12,650 kg) ♥ 12 LT 15 cwt (12,950 kg)
  - Coupled: ♠ 11 LT 14 cwt (11,890 kg) ♥ 12 LT (12,190 kg)
  - Tender bogie: Bogie 1: 17 LT 13 cwt (17,930 kg); Bogie 2: 18 LT 16 cwt (19,100 kg)
  - Tender axle: 9 LT 8 cwt (9,551 kg)
- Adhesive weight: ♠ 46 LT 16 cwt (47,550 kg) ♥ 48 LT (48,770 kg)
- Loco weight: ♠ 59 LT 5 cwt (60,200 kg) ♥ 60 LT 15 cwt (61,720 kg)
- Tender weight: 36 LT 9 cwt (37,030 kg)
- Total weight: ♠ 95 LT 14 cwt (97,240 kg) ♥ 97 LT 4 cwt (98,760 kg)
- Tender type: XE1 (2-axle bogies); XC, XC1, XD, XE, XE1, XF, XF1, XF2, XJ, XM, XM1, XM2, XM3 permitted
- Fuel type: Coal
- Fuel capacity: 10 LT (10.2 t)
- Water cap.: 2,855 imp gal (13,000 L)
- Firebox
  - Type: Round-top
  - Grate area: ♠ 27.5 sq ft (2.55 m^{2}) ♥ 21 sq ft (2.0 m^{2})
- Boiler
  - Pitch: ♠ 7 ft 2 1/2 in (2,197 mm) ♥ 7 ft 3 in (2,210 mm)
  - Diameter: 5 ft (1,524 mm)
  - Tube plates: ♠ 11 ft 1/4 in (3,359 mm) ♥ 11 ft 3/8 in (3,362 mm)
  - Small tubes: ♠ 205: 2 in (51 mm) ♥ 115: 2 in (51 mm)
  - Large tubes: ♥ 18: 5 1/2 in (140 mm)
- Boiler pressure: 180 psi (1,241 kPa)
- Safety valve: Ramsbottom
- Heating surface
  - Firebox: ♠ 137 sq ft (12.7 m^{2}) ♥ 131 sq ft (12.2 m^{2})
  - Tubes: ♠ 1,184 sq ft (110.0 m^{2}) ♥ 950 sq ft (88 m^{2})
  - Total surface: ♠ 1,321 sq ft (122.7 m^{2}) ♥ 1,081 sq ft (100.4 m^{2})
- Superheater
  - Heating area: ♥ 214 sq ft (19.9 m^{2})
- Cylinders: Two
- Cylinder size: ♠ 18 1/2 in (470 mm) bore 24 in (610 mm) stroke ♥ 19 in (483 mm) bore 24 in (610 mm) stroke
- Valve gear: Stephenson
- Valve type: ♠ Slide - ♥ Piston
- Couplers: Johnston link-and-pin AAR knuckle (1930s)
Performance figures
- Tractive effort: ♠ 23,110 lbf (102.8 kN) @ 75% ♥ 24,370 lbf (108.4 kN) @ 75%
Career
- Operators: Cape Government Railways; South African Railways
- Class: CGR 8th Class, SAR Class 8E
- Number in class: 4
- Numbers: CGR 813-816; SAR 1230-1233
- Delivered: 1903
- First run: 1903
- As built, the leading coupled axle had flangeless wheels

The South African Railways Class 8E 4-8-0 of 1903 was a steam locomotive from the pre-Union era in the Cape of Good Hope.

In 1903, at the same time that the Cape Government Railways ordered its second batch of 38 8th Class 4-8-0 Mastodon type steam locomotives, four additional experimental locomotives of the same class were ordered, built to modified specifications to accommodate a larger firegrate area. In 1912, when these four locomotives were assimilated into the South African Railways, they were renumbered and designated Class 8E.

== Manufacture ==
=== Evolution ===
The first Cape Government Railways (CGR) 8th Class locomotive was a 2-8-0 Consolidation type, designed by H.M. Beatty, the CGR's Chief Locomotive Superintendent from 1896 to 1910. These locomotives were later to become the South African Railways (SAR) Class 8X. While these first Schenectady- and ALCO-built 2-8-0 locomotives were being subjected to exhaustive testing on all types of traffic and under varying conditions, some trouble was experienced with the leading two-wheeled pony truck and, when designs were prepared at Salt River for a later order for more locomotives, the pony truck was replaced with a four-wheeled bogie, which resulted in the CGR's 4-8-0 Mastodon type 8th Class.

In spite of the difference in wheel arrangements, the CGR's 2-8-0 Consolidations and post-7th Class 4-8-0 Mastodons were all grouped together as the 8th Class.

=== Design ===
In 1902, when a second batch of 38 8th Class 4-8-0 locomotives was ordered, later to become the Class 8D on the SAR, an additional four engines were ordered. These were of an experimental design, built to modified specifications.

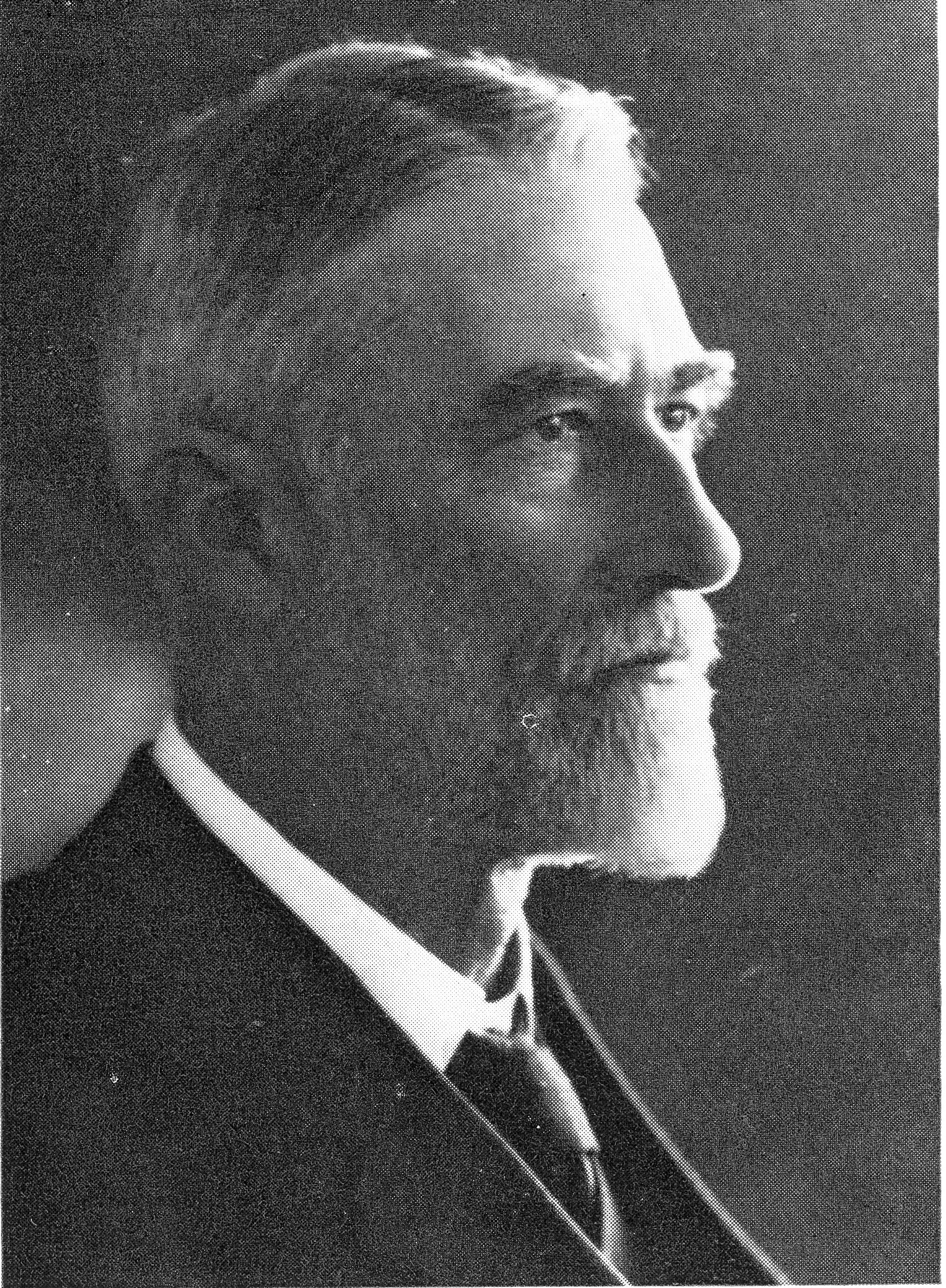
H.M. Beatty

Beatty believed that, while the earlier 8th Class locomotives (later the SAR Class 8) steamed well, they would steam even better if they had a larger firegrate area. He was hampered by the fact that the firebox wrapper plates had to fit between the rearmost coupled wheels. The result was that the greatest inside width obtainable on a firebox which was arranged between the wheels of a Cape gauge locomotive was 27 1/2 inches (698 millimetres). He overcame this by designing an 8th Class locomotive with a deep curve in the foundation ring (mud ring) to clear the intermediate coupled wheels and a steep slope towards the rear to clear the trailing wheels. In the process he was able to increase the firegrate area from 21 to 27.5 square feet (1.951 to 2.555 square metres).

=== Builders ===
The locomotives were ordered from Neilson, Reid and Company and delivered in 1903. They were delivered with Type XE1 tenders, numbered in the range from 813 to 816 and allocated to the Western System of the CGR.

== Class 8 sub-classes ==
When the Union of South Africa was established on 31 May 1910, the three Colonial government railways (CGR, Natal Government Railways and Central South African Railways) were united under a single administration to control and administer the railways, ports and harbours of the Union. Although the South African Railways and Harbours came into existence in 1910, the actual classification and renumbering of all the rolling stock of the three constituent railways were only implemented with effect from 1 January 1912.

These locomotives, together with the rest of the CGR's fleet of 8th Class 2-8-0 Consolidations and 8th Class 4-8-0 Mastodons, plus the Classes 8-L1 to 8-L3 4-8-0 Mastodon locomotives from the Central South African Railways, were grouped into ten different sub-classes by the SAR. The 4-8-0 locomotives became SAR Classes 8 and 8A to 8F, while the 2-8-0 locomotives became Classes 8X to 8Z.

In 1912, these four locomotives were renumbered in the range from 1230 to 1233 and designated Class 8E on the SAR.

== Modifications ==
=== Reboilering ===
With no appreciable gain obtained in steaming capacity, the enlarged grate area on these experimental locomotives did not come up to expectations. Since the fireboxes began to have problems with cracks and leaking rivets soon after the locomotives were placed in service, the experimental boilers and fireboxes were soon replaced with standard 8th Class boilers and fireboxes.

=== Superheating ===
During A.G. Watson's term as the Chief Mechanical Engineer (CME) of the SAR from 1929 to 1936, many of the Class 8 to Class 8F locomotives were equipped with superheated boilers, larger bore cylinders and either inside or outside admission piston valves. The outside admission valve locomotives had their cylinder bore increased from 18 1/2 to 19 inches (470 to 483 millimetres) and retained their existing SAR classifications, while the inside admission valve locomotives had their cylinder bore increased to 20 inches (508 millimetres) and were reclassified by having a "W" suffix added to their existing SAR classifications.

Of the four Class 8E locomotives, numbers 1232 and 1233 were equipped with superheated boilers, 19 inches (483 millimetres) bore cylinders and outside admission piston valves, while retaining their Class 8E classification.

== Service ==
In SAR service, the 4-8-0 Class 8 family of locomotives worked on every system in the country and, during the 1920s, became the mainstay of motive power on many branch lines. Their final days were spent in shunting service. By 1972, they were all withdrawn from service.
