= South African Class 10A 4-6-2 =

1910 design of steam locomotive

CSAR Class 10-2 4-6-2 Saturated South African Class 10A & 10BR 4-6-2
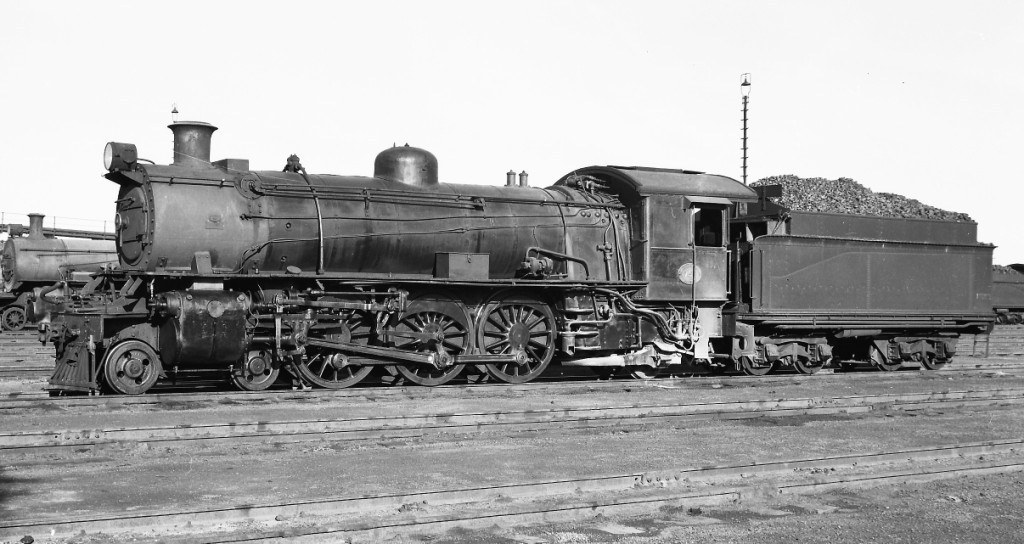
- Class 10BR, ex Class 10A no. 751, ex CSAR Class 10-2 no. 669
Type and origin
- ♠ Class 10A as built with a Belpaire firebox ♥ Class 10BR rebuilt with a Watson Standard boiler
- Power type: Steam
- Designer: Central South African Railways (G.G. Elliot)
- Builder: North British Locomotive Company
- Serial number: 18971-18975
- Model: CSAR Class 10-2
- Build date: 1910
- Total produced: 5
Specifications
- Configuration
  - Whyte: 4-6-2 (Pacific)
  - UIC: ♠ 2'C1'n2 – ♥ 2'C1'h2
- Driver: 2nd coupled axle
- Gauge: 3 ft 6 in (1,067 mm) Cape gauge
- Leading dia.: 28 1/2 in (724 mm)
- Coupled dia.: 62 in (1,575 mm)
- Trailing dia.: 33 in (838 mm)
- Tender wheels: 34 in (864 mm)
- Wheelbase: 55 ft 8 in (16,967 mm)
  - Engine: 30 ft 2 in (9,195 mm)
  - Leading: 6 ft (1,829 mm)
  - Coupled: 10 ft 10 in (3,302 mm)
  - Tender: 16 ft 9 in (5,105 mm)
  - Tender bogie: 4 ft 7 in (1,397 mm)
- Length
  - Over couplers: 63 ft 10 3/4 in (19,475 mm)
- Height: ♠ 12 ft 10 in (3,912 mm) ♥ 12 ft 11 in (3,937 mm)
- Frame type: Plate
- Axle load: ♠ 15 LT 18 cwt (16,160 kg) ♥ 16 LT 8 cwt (16,660 kg)
  - Leading: ♠ 14 LT 5 cwt (14,480 kg) ♥ 15 LT 6 cwt (15,550 kg)
  - 1st coupled: ♠ 15 LT 9 cwt (15,700 kg) ♥ 15 LT 9 cwt (15,700 kg)
  - 2nd coupled: ♠ 15 LT 18 cwt (16,160 kg) ♥ 16 LT 6 cwt (16,560 kg)
  - 3rd coupled: ♠ 15 LT 13 cwt (15,900 kg) ♥ 16 LT 8 cwt (16,660 kg)
  - Trailing: ♠ 12 LT 10 cwt (12,700 kg) ♥ 13 LT 11 cwt (13,770 kg)
  - Tender bogie: Bogie 1: 24 LT 4 cwt (24,590 kg); Bogie 2: 25 LT 3 cwt (25,550 kg)
  - Tender axle: 12 LT 11 cwt 2 qtr (12,780 kg)
- Adhesive weight: ♠ 47 LT (47,750 kg) ♥ 48 LT 3 cwt (48,920 kg)
- Loco weight: ♠ 73 LT 15 cwt (74,930 kg) ♥ 76 LT 2 cwt (77,320 kg)
- Tender weight: 49 LT 7 cwt (50,140 kg)
- Total weight: ♠ 123 LT 2 cwt (125,100 kg) ♥ 125 LT 9 cwt (127,500 kg)
- Tender type: XM2 (2-axle bogies); XC, XC1, XD, XE, XE1, XF, XF1, XF2, XJ, XM, XM1, XM2, XM3, XM4, XP1, XS permitted
- Fuel type: Coal
- Fuel capacity: 10 LT (10.2 t)
- Water cap.: 4,000 imp gal (18,200 L)
- Firebox
  - Type: ♠ Belpaire – ♥ Round-top
  - Grate area: ♠ 34.6 sq ft (3.21 m^{2}) ♥ 36 sq ft (3.3 m^{2})
- Boiler
  - Model: ♥ Watson Standard no. 1
  - Pitch: ♠ 7 ft 4 in (2,235 mm) ♥ 8 ft (2,438 mm)
  - Diameter: ♠ 4 ft 6 3/4 in (1,391 mm) ♥ 5 ft (1,524 mm)
  - Tube plates: ♠ 18 ft 6 1/2 in (5,652 mm) ♥ 17 ft 9 in (5,410 mm)
  - Small tubes: ♠ 154: 2 1/4 in (57 mm) ♥ 76: 2 1/2 in (64 mm)
  - Large tubes: ♥ 24: 5 1/2 in (140 mm)
- Boiler pressure: ♠ 200 psi (1,379 kPa) ♥ 180 psi (1,241 kPa)
- Safety valve: ♠ Ramsbottom ♥ Pop
- Feedwater heater: Trevithick exhaust steam type
- Heating surface
  - Firebox: ♠ 128 sq ft (11.9 m^{2}) ♥ 123 sq ft (11.4 m^{2})
  - Tubes: ♠ 1,682 sq ft (156.3 m^{2}) ♥ 1,497 sq ft (139.1 m^{2})
  - Total surface: ♠ 1,810 sq ft (168 m^{2}) ♥ 1,620 sq ft (151 m^{2})
- Superheater
  - Heating area: ♥ 366 sq ft (34.0 m^{2})
- Cylinders: Two
- Cylinder size: ♠ 18 1/2 in (470 mm) bore ♥ 20 in (508 mm) bore ♠♥ 28 in (711 mm) stroke
- Valve gear: Walschaerts
- Valve type: Piston
- Couplers: Johnston link-and-pin AAR knuckle (1930s)
Performance figures
- Tractive effort: ♠ 23,180 lbf (103.1 kN) @ 75% ♥ 24,390 lbf (108.5 kN) @ 75%
Career
- Operators: Central South African Railways; South African Railways
- Class: CSAR Class 10-2, SAR Class 10A
- Number in class: 5
- Numbers: CSAR 665-669, SAR 747-751
- Delivered: 1910
- First run: 1910
- Withdrawn: 1974
- The 2nd coupled axle had flangeless wheels

The South African Railways Class 10A 4-6-2 of 1910 was a steam locomotive from the pre-Union era in Transvaal.

In 1910, the Central South African Railways placed ten Class 10-2 4-6-2 Pacific type steam locomotives in service, of which five were built with and five without superheaters. In 1912, when the five saturated steam locomotives were assimilated into the South African Railways, they were renumbered and designated Class 10A.

== Manufacturer ==
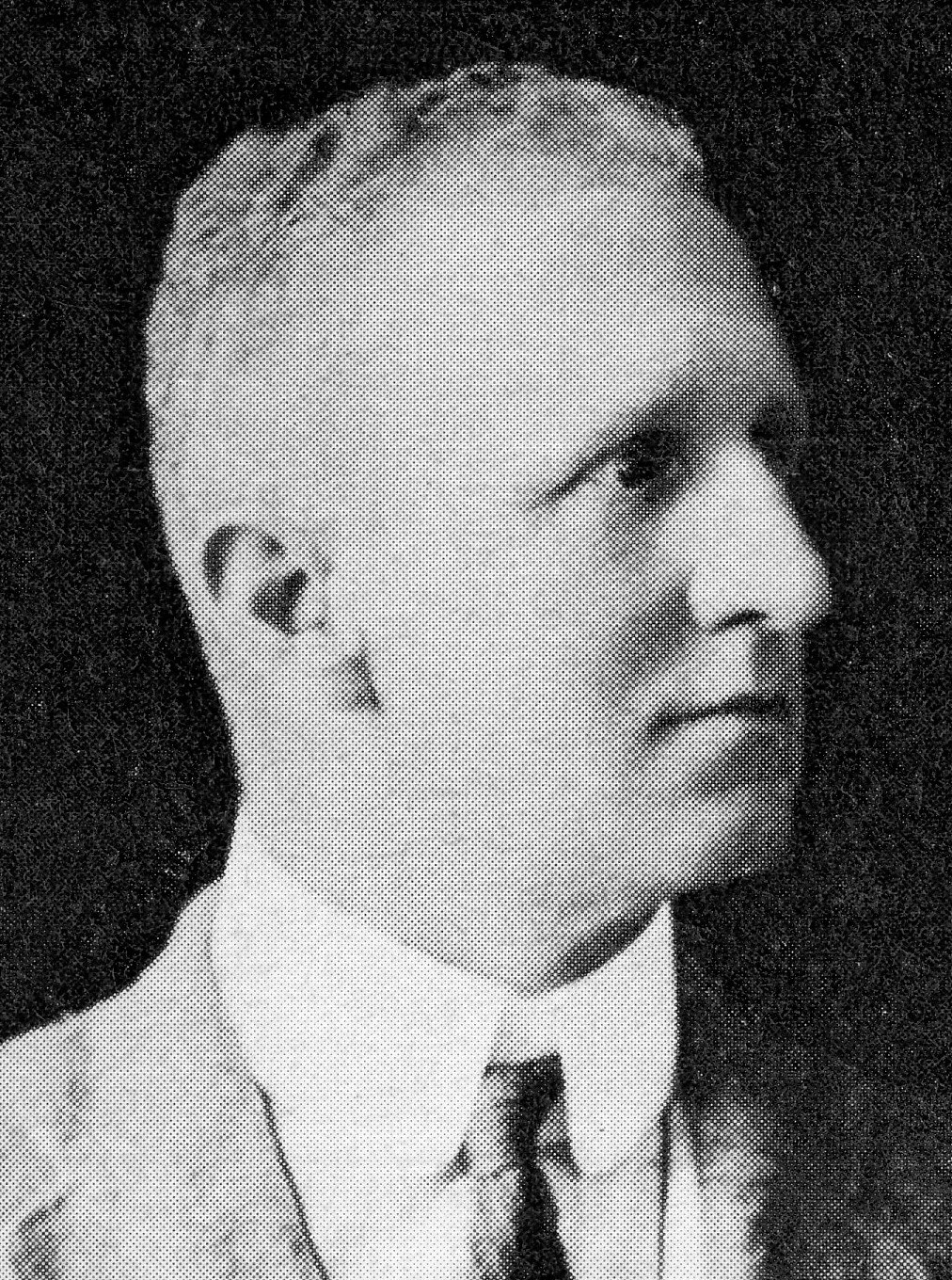
G.G. Elliot

Ten heavy 4-6-2 Pacific type passenger locomotives, designed by Central South African Railways (CSAR) Chief Mechanical Engineer G.G. Elliot and based on the Class 10 design of his predecessor, CSAR Chief Locomotive Superintendent P.A. Hyde, were ordered from the North British Locomotive Company and delivered in 1910. They had plate frames, Belpaire fireboxes and Walschaerts valve gear and were delivered in two variants, with five of them using saturated steam while the rest were superheated. They were all designated Class 10-2 by the CSAR, numbered in the range from 665 to 674, and entered service in March 1910.

== Characteristics ==
The Class 10-2 saturated locomotives were similar to the Class 10, except that their boilers were arranged 7 7/8 inches (200 millimetres) further forward and their firebox throats and back plates were sloped instead of being vertical. This modification brought the chimney in line with the cylinders and avoided a "set" in the blastpipe. The cylinders were arranged outside the plate frames. Like the Class 10, the locomotives had 62 inches (1,575 millimetres) diameter coupled wheels, the largest yet used in South Africa at the time.

The Walschaerts valve gear was controlled by a vertical type of steam reversing engine which was attached to the right-hand side of the boiler, just below the dome. It consisted of a 5 1/2 inches (140 millimetres) diameter steam cylinder and a 4 inches (102 millimetres) diameter oil cylinder, fitted with a common piston rod with a crosshead which was machined integral with the piston rod. This crosshead was connected to a lever fitted to the reversing shaft. After 1912, these reversing engines were replaced with Hendrie steam reversers.

While the Class 10 had outside admission valves, the Class 10-2 saturated used inside admission piston valves. Two Trevithick exhaust steam feedwater heaters were mounted on the running boards on either side of the smokebox above the cylinders and a Weir's feedwater pump was mounted on the left-hand side of the firebox. Each feedwater heater cylinder was of 1 foot 2 1/2 inches (368 millimetres) external diameter and 5 feet 4 inches (1,626 millimetres) between tube plates, and contained 108 3/4 inch (19 millimetres) external diameter brass tubes. The feedwater heaters and the feedwater pump were removed after a few years since the feedwater heater tubes proved to be troublesome to clean.

A Wakefield mechanical-feed lubricator was arranged on the right-hand side running board and was operated through a lever and crank, actuated from the crosshead. Mechanical lubricators had the advantage that the rate of oil-feed was always proportional to the speed of the engine. This type of oil feed was later superseded for the sight-feed lubricator.

The engines were fitted with the Flaman speed recorder, of which the driving gear was connected to the right trailing crank pin. The records obtained from these indicators were of considerable value when operating fast passenger services. The sand boxes were arranged in front of the leading coupled wheels and fitted with steam sanding gear, which was later found to be an unnecessary refinement for South African conditions.

== South African Railways ==
When the Union of South Africa was established on 31 May 1910, the three Colonial government railways (Cape Government Railways, Natal Government Railways and CSAR) were united under a single administration to control and administer the railways, ports and harbours of the Union. Although the South African Railways and Harbours came into existence in 1910, the actual classification and renumbering of all the rolling stock of the three constituent railways were only implemented with effect from 1 January 1912.

When they were assimilated into the South African Railways (SAR) in 1912, the five saturated steam locomotives, numbered in the CSAR range from 665 to 669, were designated Class 10A and renumbered in the range from 747 to 751. The five superheated locomotives were designated Class 10B.

== Watson standard boilers ==
In the 1930s, many serving locomotives were reboilered with a standard round-topped boiler type, designed by then Chief Mechanical Engineer A.G. Watson as part of his standardisation policy. Such Watson Standard reboilered locomotives were reclassified by adding an "R" suffix to their classification letter.

All five Class 10A locomotives were eventually reboilered with Watson Standard no. 1 boilers. Since the original difference between the Class 10A and Class 10B lay only in the fact that their respective boilers were constructed without or with superheaters, distinction between the two types became unnecessary after this reboilering. The reboilered Class 10A locomotives were therefore reclassified to Class 10BR along with similarly reboilered Class 10B locomotives.

Their original boilers were fitted with Ramsbottom safety valves, while the Watson Standard boilers were fitted with Pop safety valves. An obvious difference between an original and a Watson Standard reboilered locomotive is usually the rectangular regulator cover just to the rear of the chimney on the reboilered locomotive. In the case of the Class 10BR locomotives, an even more obvious difference was the absence of the Belpaire firebox hump between the cab and boiler on the reboilered engines.

== Service ==
The Class 10-2 saturated locomotives were placed in service to haul passenger trains out of Johannesburg. In service, it was found that their superheated sister locomotives could handle almost 25% more load, so much so that double-heading of passenger trains in the Orange Free State became unnecessary with the Class 10-2 superheated locomotive.

The Class 10-2 saturated locomotives were therefore soon taken off mainline passenger service and put to good use on suburban work. After reboilering and reclassification to Class 10BR, most of the rest of their working lives were spent on the Cape Midland system where they were used on the mainline out of Port Elizabeth.

Two worked as station pilots at Kimberley until 1960, when they joined the rest of the Class which were by then working the suburban between Port Elizabeth and Uitenhage. In later years, they again served on the Reef's suburban routes, while a few were used in the same type of service around Cape Town until they were eventually relegated to shunting work. All but one were scrapped in 1974.

== Preservation ==
Of the Class 10BR, three survived into preservation. By 2019

Number	Works nmr	THF / Private	Leaselend / Owner	Current Location	Outside SOUTH AFRICA	?
750		THF	Transnet Heritage Foundation	Roodepoort Station		
756		THF	Transnet Heritage Foundation	Kroonstad Station		
758		Private	Uitenhage Railway Museum	Uitenhage Railway Museum		

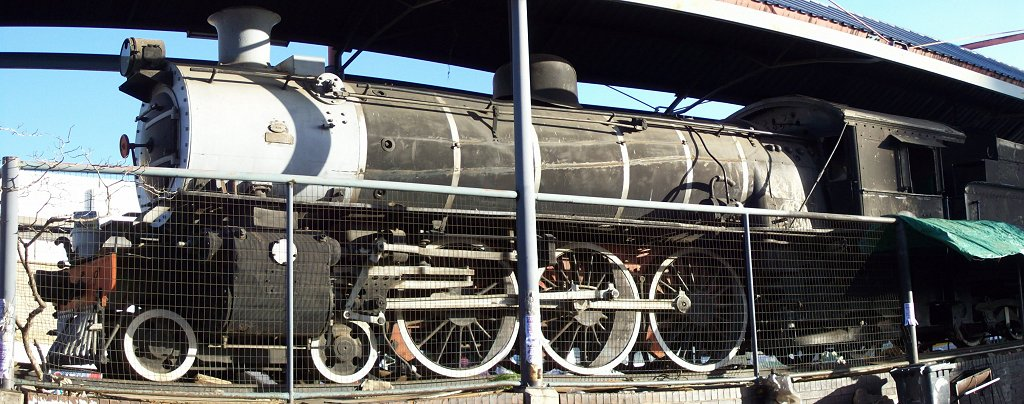
Class 10BR, ex Class 10A no. 750, originally CSAR Class 10-2 no. 668, at Roodepoort Station, 7 February 2009
