= South African Class 8F 4-8-0 =

1904 design of steam locomotive

CGR 8th Class 4-8-0 1904 South African Classes 8F & 8FW 4-8-0
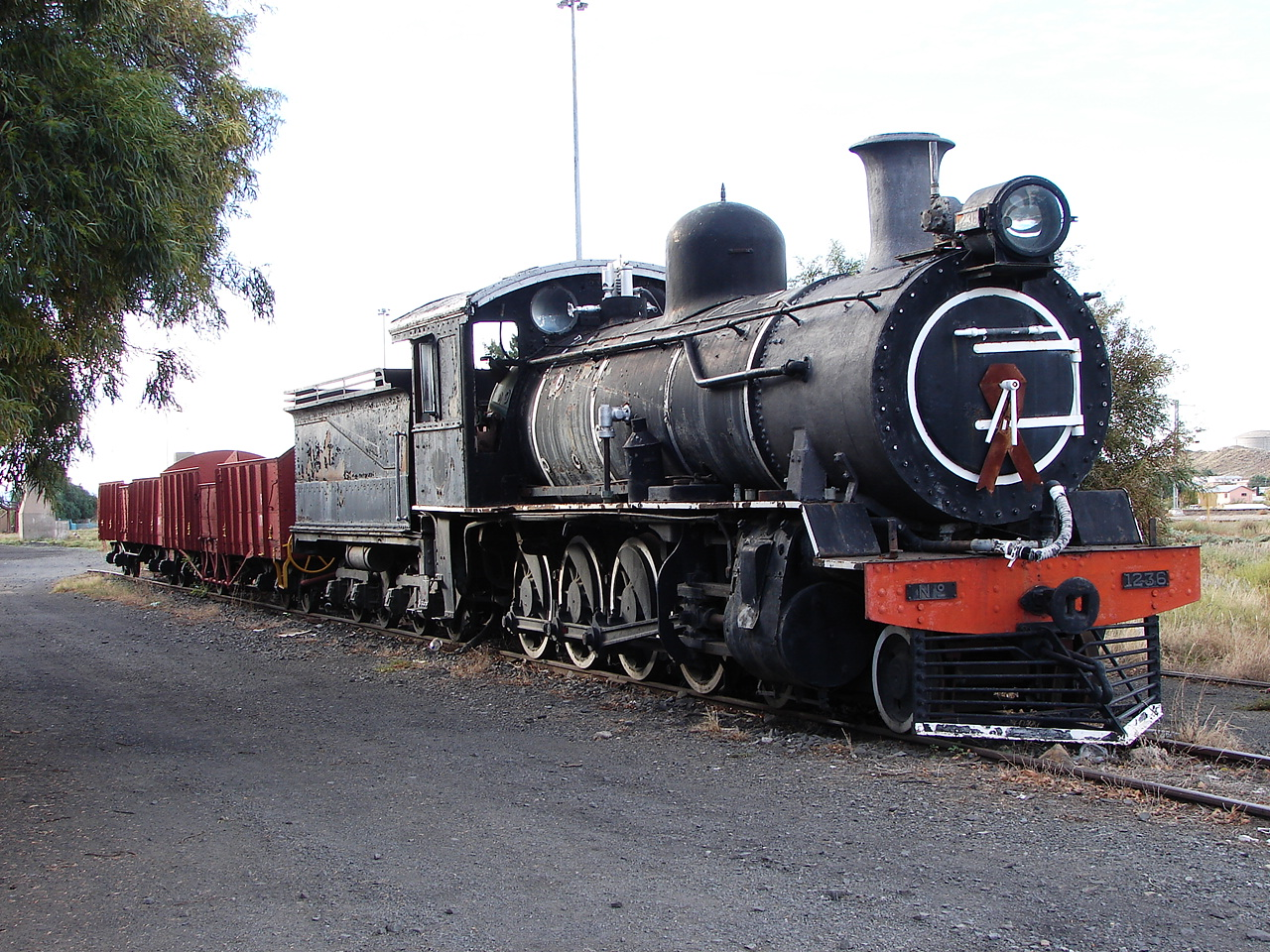
- Class 8FW no. 1236 plinthed at De Aar, 27 May 2013
Type and origin
- ♠ Original locomotive, as built ♥ Superheated, inside admission valves, Class 8FW
- Power type: Steam
- Designer: Cape Government Railways (H.M. Beatty)
- Builder: North British Locomotive Company
- Serial number: 16161-16170
- Model: CGR 8th Class (4-8-0)
- Build date: 1904
- Total produced: 10
Specifications
- Configuration
  - Whyte: 4-8-0 (Mastodon)
  - UIC: ♠ 2'Dn2 - ♥ 2'Dh2
- Driver: 2nd coupled axle
- Gauge: 3 ft 6 in (1,067 mm) Cape gauge
- Leading dia.: 28 1/2 in (724 mm)
- Coupled dia.: 48 in (1,219 mm)
- Tender wheels: 33 1/2 in (851 mm) as built 34 in (864 mm) retyred
- Wheelbase: 46 ft 10 1/2 in (14,288 mm)
  - Engine: 23 ft 3 in (7,087 mm)
  - Leading: 6 ft (1,829 mm)
  - Coupled: 13 ft 6 in (4,115 mm)
  - Tender: 14 ft 7 in (4,445 mm)
  - Tender bogie: 4 ft 7 in (1,397 mm)
- Length
  - Over couplers: 54 ft 2 1/4 in (16,516 mm)
- Height: ♠♥ 12 ft 10 in (3,912 mm)
- Frame type: Bar
- Axle load: ♠ 11 LT 14 cwt (11,890 kg) ♥ 12 LT 11 cwt (12,750 kg)
  - Leading: ♠ 12 LT 9 cwt (12,650 kg) ♥ 12 LT 15 cwt (12,950 kg)
  - Coupled: ♠ 11 LT 14 cwt (11,890 kg)
  - 1st coupled: ♥ 11 LT 18 cwt (12,090 kg)
  - 2nd coupled: ♥ 12 LT 11 cwt (12,750 kg)
  - 3rd coupled: ♥ 11 LT 19 cwt (12,140 kg)
  - 4th coupled: ♥ 11 LT 18 cwt (12,090 kg)
  - Tender bogie: Bogie 1: 20 LT 14 cwt (21,030 kg); Bogie 2: 22 LT 7 cwt (22,710 kg)
  - Tender axle: 11 LT 3 cwt 2 qtr (11,350 kg)
- Adhesive weight: ♠ 46 LT 16 cwt (47,550 kg) ♥ 48 LT 6 cwt (49,080 kg)
- Loco weight: ♠ 59 LT 5 cwt (60,200 kg) ♥ 61 LT 1 cwt (62,030 kg)
- Tender weight: 43 LT 1 cwt (43,740 kg)
- Total weight: ♠ 102 LT 6 cwt (103,900 kg) ♥ 104 LT 2 cwt (105,800 kg)
- Tender type: XF (2-axle bogies); XC, XC1, XD, XE, XE1, XF, XF1, XF2, XJ, XM, XM1, XM2, XM3 permitted
- Fuel type: Coal
- Fuel capacity: 10 LT (10.2 t)
- Water cap.: 3,000 imp gal (13,600 L)
- Firebox
  - Type: Round-top
  - Grate area: ♠ 21.35 sq ft (1.983 m^{2}) ♥ 21 sq ft (2.0 m^{2})
- Boiler
  - Pitch: ♠♥ 7 ft 3 in (2,210 mm)
  - Diameter: ♠♥ 5 ft (1,524 mm)
  - Tube plates: ♠ 11 ft 1/4 in (3,359 mm) ♥ 11 ft 3/8 in (3,362 mm)
  - Small tubes: ♠ 205: 2 in (51 mm) ♥ 115: 2 in (51 mm)
  - Large tubes: ♥ 18: 5 1/2 in (140 mm)
- Boiler pressure: ♠♥ 180 psi (1,241 kPa)
- Safety valve: Ramsbottom
- Heating surface
  - Firebox: ♠ 136.6 sq ft (12.69 m^{2}) ♥ 131 sq ft (12.2 m^{2})
  - Tubes: ♠ 1,184 sq ft (110.0 m^{2}) ♥ 950 sq ft (88 m^{2})
  - Total surface: ♠ 1,320.6 sq ft (122.69 m^{2}) ♥ 1,081 sq ft (100.4 m^{2})
- Superheater
  - Heating area: ♥ 214 sq ft (19.9 m^{2})
- Cylinders: Two
- Cylinder size: ♠ 18 1/2 in (470 mm) bore ♥ 20 in (508 mm) bore ♠♥ 24 in (610 mm) stroke
- Valve gear: Stephenson
- Valve type: ♠ Slide - ♥ Piston
- Couplers: Johnston link-and-pin AAR knuckle (1930s)
Performance figures
- Tractive effort: ♠ 23,110 lbf (102.8 kN) @ 75% ♥ 27,000 lbf (120 kN) @ 75%
Career
- Operators: Cape Government Railways; South African Railways
- Class: CGR 8th Class; SAR Classes 8F & 8FW
- Number in class: 10
- Numbers: CGR 829-838; SAR 1234-1243
- Delivered: 1904
- First run: 1904
- Withdrawn: 1972
- The leading coupled axle had flangeless wheels

The South African Railways Class 8F 4-8-0 of 1904 was a steam locomotive from the pre-Union era in the Cape of Good Hope.

In 1904, the Cape Government Railways placed its final batch of ten 8th Class 4-8-0 Mastodon type steam locomotives in service. In 1912, when they were assimilated into the South African Railways, they were renumbered and designated Class 8F.

== Manufacture ==
=== Evolution ===
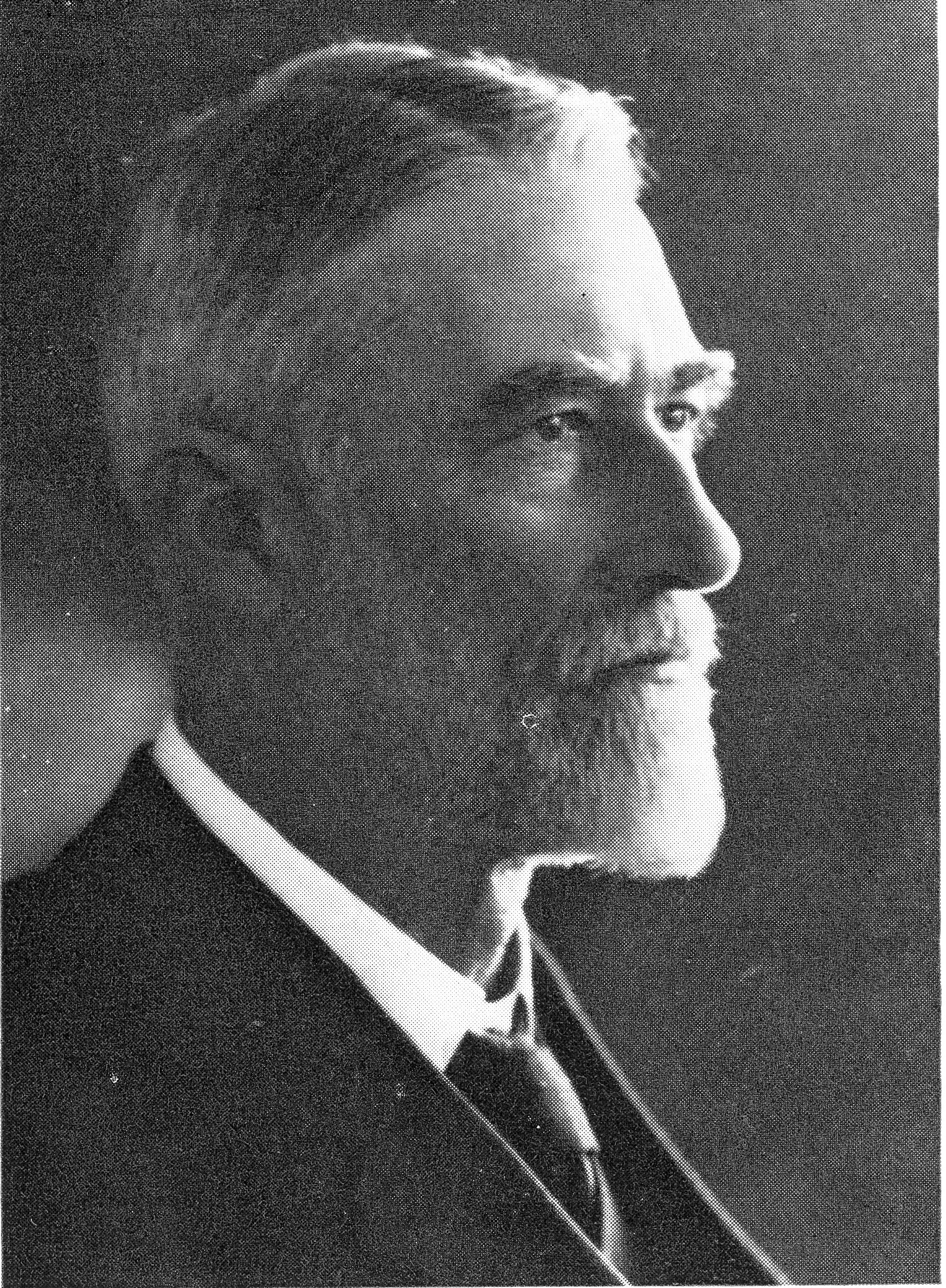
H.M. Beatty

The first 8th Class locomotive of the Cape Government Railways (CGR) was a 2-8-0 Consolidation type designed by H.M. Beatty, the CGR's Chief Locomotive Superintendent from 1896 to 1910. It was later to become the Class 8X on the South African Railways (SAR). While these first Schenectady- and ALCO-built 2-8-0 locomotives were being subjected to exhaustive testing on all types of traffic and under varying conditions, some trouble was experienced with the leading two-wheeled pony truck. When designs were prepared at Salt River for a later order for more locomotives, the pony truck was replaced with a four-wheeled bogie.

=== Builders ===
Orders for the last 8th Class locomotives for the CGR were placed with the North British Locomotive Company (NBL) in 1903. The ten locomotives were built and delivered in 1904, numbered in the range from 829 to 838 and allocated to the Western System of the CGR.

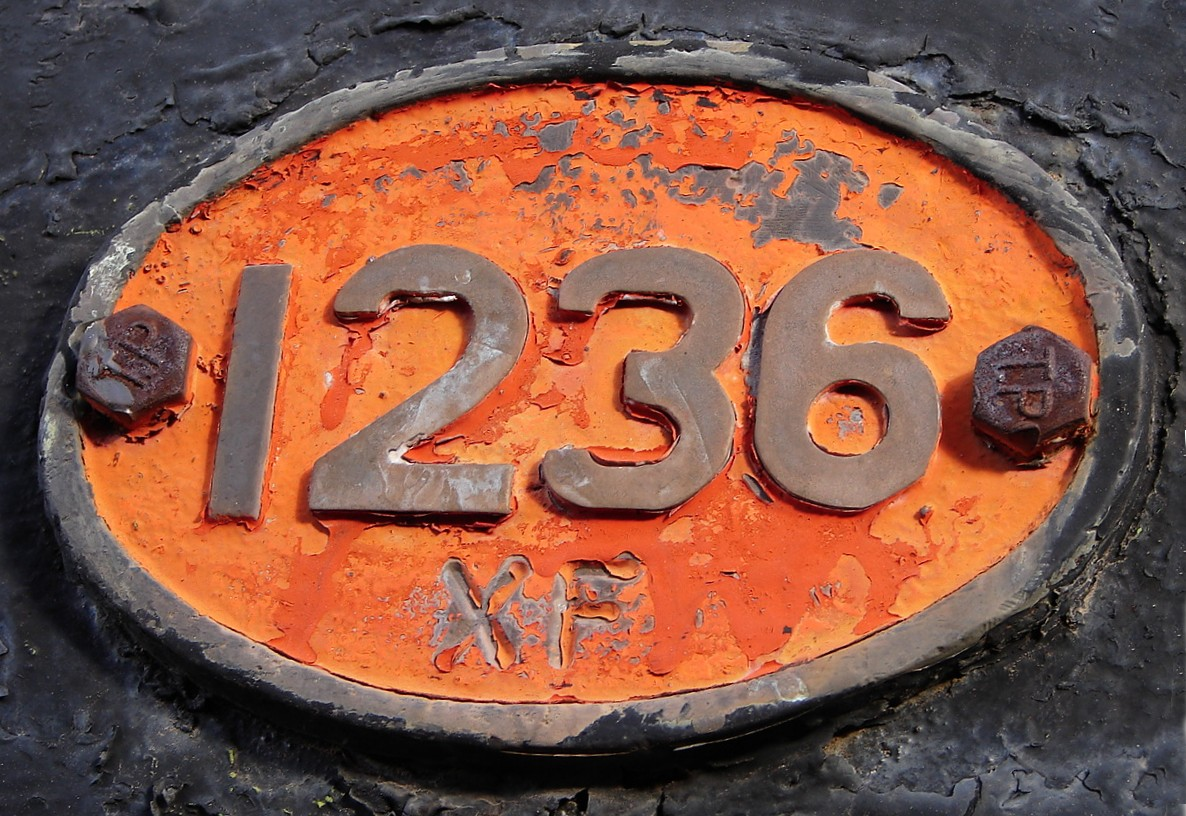
Type XF tender plate

These ten locomotives were the final batch of CGR 8th Class locomotives to be built with a 4-8-0 Mastodon type wheel arrangement.

They were delivered with Type XF tenders with a coal capacity of 10 long tons (10.2 tonnes), a water capacity of 3,000 imperial gallons (14,000 litres) and a maximum axle load of 11 long tons 3 hundredweight 2 quarters (11,350 kilograms).

=== Class 8 sub-classes ===
When the Union of South Africa was established on 31 May 1910, the three Colonial government railways (CGR, Natal Government Railways and Central South African Railways) were united under a single administration to control and administer the railways, ports and harbours of the Union. Even though the South African Railways and Harbours came into existence in 1910, the actual classification and renumbering of all the rolling stock of the three constituent railways was only implemented with effect from 1 January 1912.

In 1912, these ten locomotives were renumbered in the range from 1234 to 1243 and designated Class 8F.

These locomotives, together with the rest of the CGR's 8th Class 2-8-0 Consolidations and 4-8-0 Mastodons and the Classes 8-L1 to 8-L3 4-8-0 Mastodon locomotives from the Central South African Railways (CSAR), were grouped into ten different sub-classes by the SAR. The 4-8-0 locomotives were designated SAR Classes 8 and 8A to 8F and the 2-8-0 locomotives were designated Classes 8X to 8Z.

== Modification ==
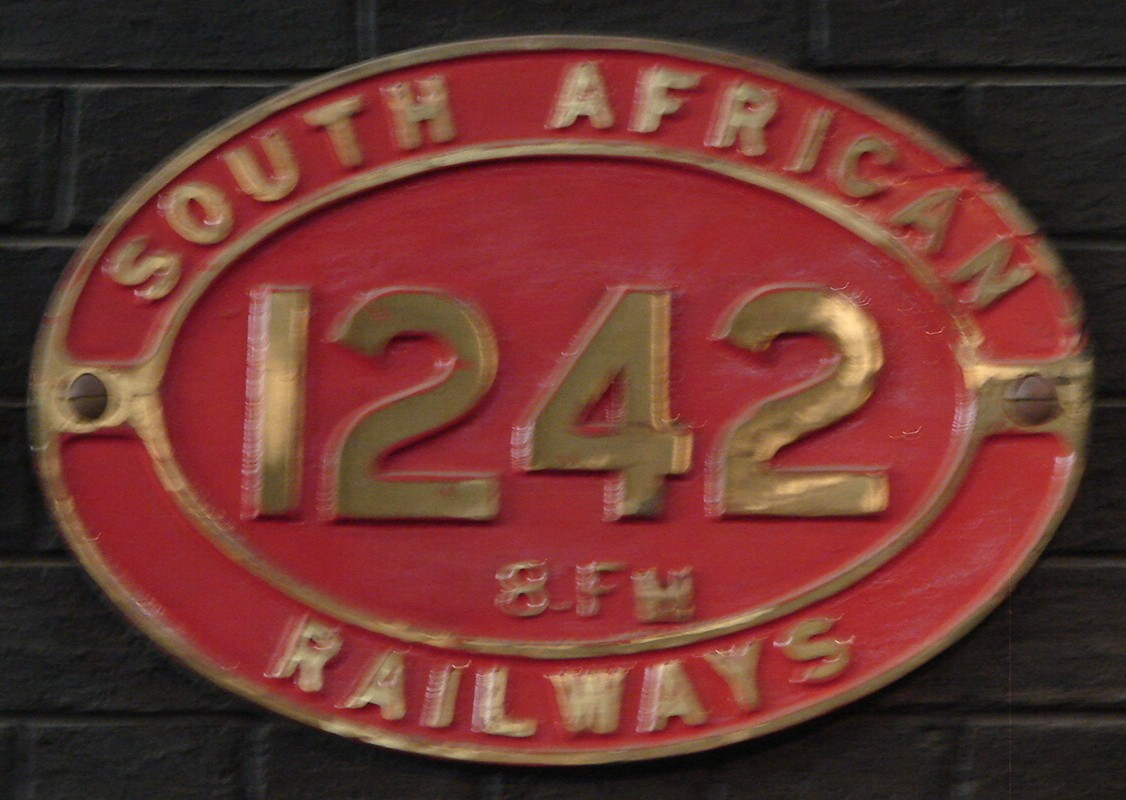

During A.G. Watson's term as Chief Mechanical Engineer of the SAR from 1929 to 1936, many of the Classes 8 to 8F locomotives were equipped with superheated boilers, larger bore cylinders and either inside or outside admission piston valves. The outside admission valve locomotives had their cylinder bore increased from 18 1/2 to 19 inches (470 to 483 millimetres) and retained their existing SAR classifications, while the inside admission valve locomotives had their cylinder bore increased to 20 inches (508 millimetres) and were reclassified by having a "W" suffix added to their existing SAR classifications.

Of the Class 8F locomotives, numbers 1236, 1242 and 1243 were equipped with superheated boilers, 20 inches (508 millimetres) bore cylinders and inside admission piston valves, and reclassified to Class 8FW.

== Service ==
In SAR service, the 4-8-0 Class 8 family of locomotives worked on every system in the country and, in the 1920s, became the mainstay of motive power on many branchlines. Their final days were spent in shunting service. They were all withdrawn from service by 1972.

== Preservation ==
Class 8FW no. 1236 is preserved and plithed at De Aar. It is the sole surviving Class 8F in South Africa.

== Illustration ==
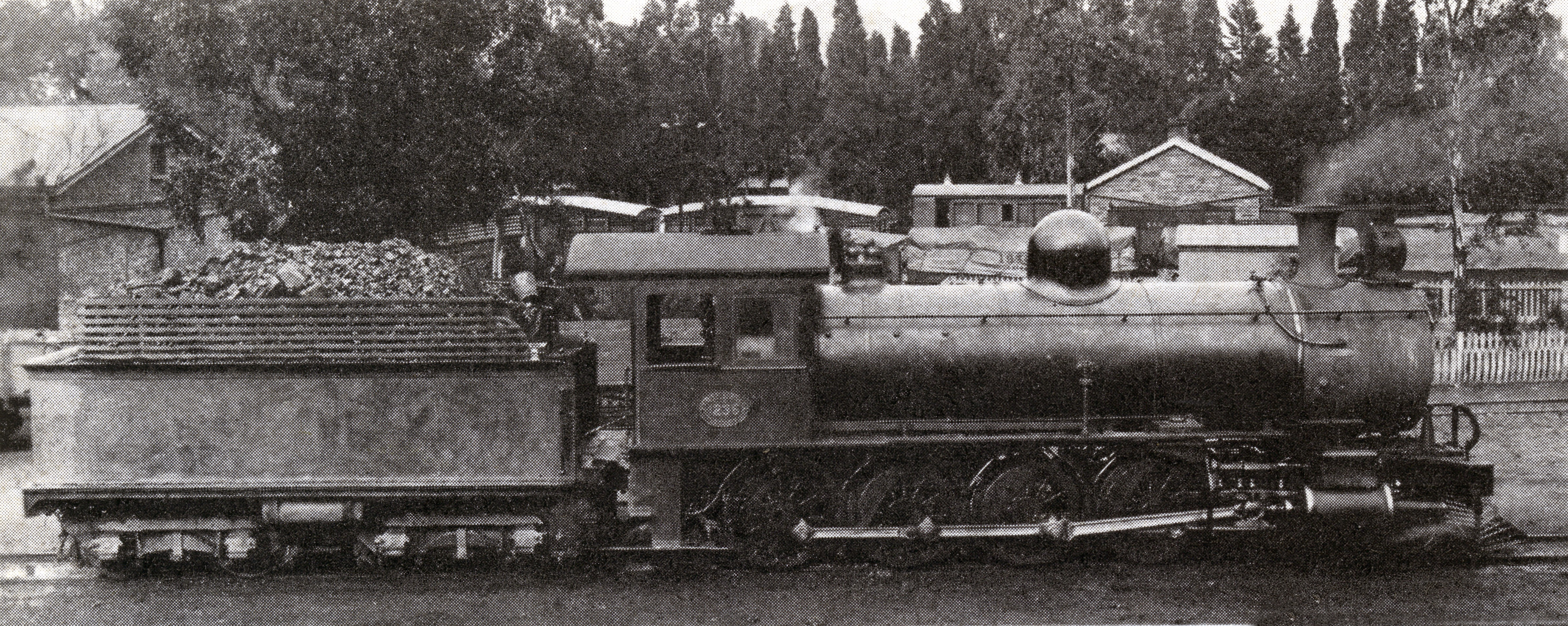
Ex CGR 8th Class no. 831, SAR Class 8F no. 1236, before modification and reclassification, c. 1930
