= South African type XJ tender =

Steam locomotive tender

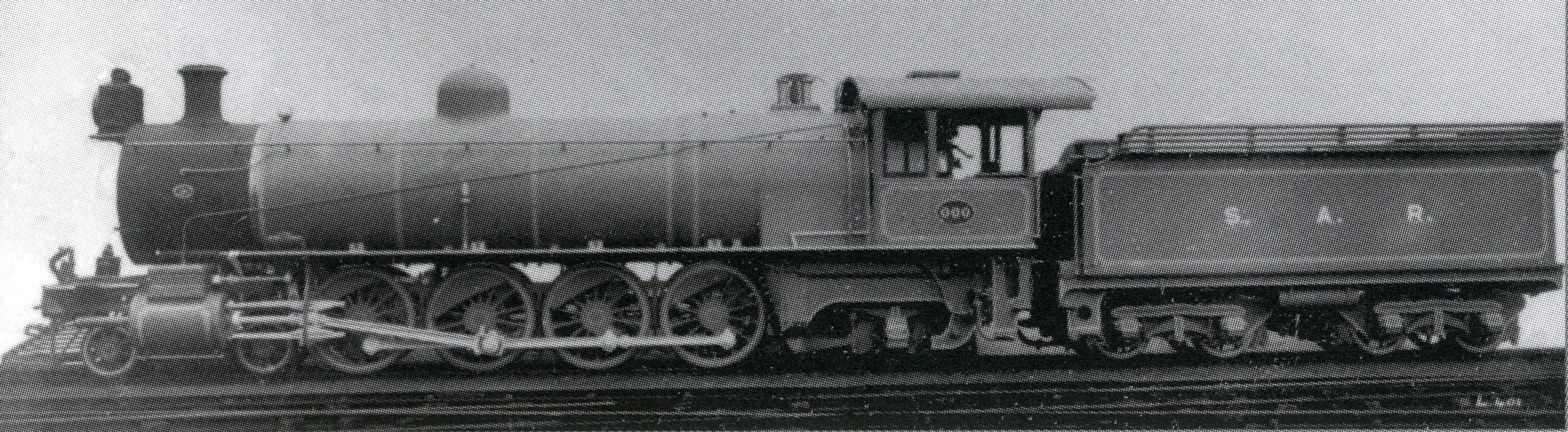
- Type XJ tender on CGR Mountain
Type and origin
- Locomotive: CGR Mountain 4-8-2
- Designer: Cape Government Railways (H.M. Beatty)
- Builder: North British Locomotive Company
- In service: 1911
Specifications
- Configuration: 2-axle bogies
- Gauge: 3 ft 6 in (1,067 mm) Cape gauge
- Length: 24 ft 3/4 in (7,334 mm)
- Wheel dia.: 33 1/2 in (851 mm) as built 34 in (864 mm) retyred
- Wheelbase: 16 ft 1 in (4,902 mm)
  - Bogie: 4 ft 7 in (1,397 mm)
- Axle load: 10 LT 19 cwt (11,130 kg)
  - Front bogie: 21 LT 11 cwt (21,900 kg)
  - Rear bogie: 21 LT 18 cwt (22,250 kg)
- Weight empty: 47,768 lb (21,667 kg)
- Weight w/o: 43 LT 9 cwt (44,150 kg)
- Fuel type: Coal
- Fuel cap.: 6 LT 10 cwt (6.6 t)
- Water cap.: 3,500 imp gal (15,900 L)
- Stoking: Manual
- Couplers: Drawbar & Johnston link-and-pin
Career
- Operators: Cape Government Railways; South African Railways
- Numbers: SAR 1477-1478

The South African type XJ tender was a steam locomotive tender.

Two Type XJ tenders entered service in 1911, as tenders to the two 4-8-2 Mountain type steam locomotives which were acquired by the Cape Government Railways in that year. These locomotives were designated Class 4 on the South African Railways in 1912.

== Manufacturer ==
Type XJ tenders were built by the North British Locomotive Company in 1911.

The Cape Government Railways (CGR) placed two 4-8-2 Mountain type steam locomotives in service in 1911, designed by CGR Chief Locomotive Superintendent H.M. Beatty at the Salt River works in Cape Town. These locomotives were designated Class 4 on the South African Railways (SAR) in 1912. The Type XJ entered service as tenders to these two engines.

== Characteristics ==
The tender had a coal capacity of 6 long tons 10 hundredweight (6.6 tonnes), a water capacity of 3,500 imperial gallons (15,900 litres) and a maximum axle load of 10 long tons 19 hundredweight (11,130 kilograms).

== Locomotive ==
In the SAR years, tenders were numbered for the engines they were delivered with. In most cases, an oval number plate, bearing the engine number and often also the tender type, would be attached to the rear end of the tender. During the classification and renumbering of locomotives onto the SAR roster in 1912, no separate classification and renumbering list was published for tenders, which should have been renumbered according to the locomotive renumbering list.

Only the two Class 4 locomotives were delivered new with Type XJ tenders, which were numbered 1477 and 1478 for their engines.

== Classification letters ==
Since many tender types are interchangeable between different locomotive classes and types, a tender classification system was adopted by the SAR. The first letter of the tender type indicates the classes of engines to which it can be coupled. The "X_" tenders could be used with the following locomotive classes:

- CGR Mountain, SAR Class 4.
- SAR Class 4A.
- SAR Class 5.
- CGR 6th Class of 1897, SAR Class 6B.
- Oranje-Vrijstaat Gouwerment-Spoorwegen 6th Class L3, SAR Class 6E.
- CGR 6th Class of 1901 (Neilson, Reid), SAR Class 6H.
- CGR 6th Class of 1902, SAR Class 6J.
- CGR 8th Class of 1902, SAR Class 8.
- Imperial Military Railways 8th Class, SAR Class 8A.
- Central South African Railways Class 8-L2, SAR Class 8B.
- Central South African Railways Class 8-L3, SAR Class 8C.
- CGR 8th Class 4-8-0 of 1903, SAR Class 8D.
- CGR 8th Class Experimental, SAR Class 8E.
- CGR 8th Class 4-8-0 of 1904, SAR Class 8F.
- CGR 8th Class 2-8-0 of 1903, SAR Class 8Y.
- CGR 8th Class 2-8-0 of 1904, SAR Class 8Z.
- Central South African Railways Class 9, SAR Class 9.
- Central South African Railways Class 10, SAR Class 10.
- Central South African Railways Class 10-2 Saturated, SAR Class 10A.
- Central South African Railways Class 10-2 Superheated. SAR Class 10B.
- Central South African Railways Class 10-C, SAR Class 10C.
- Central South African Railways Class 11, SAR Class 11.
- CGR 9th Class of 1903, SAR Class Experimental 4.
- CGR 9th Class of 1906, SAR Class Experimental 5.
- CGR 10th Class, SAR Class Experimental 6.
- SAR Class ME.
- Central South African Railways Mallet Superheated, SAR Class MF.

The second letter indicates the tender's water capacity. The "_J" tenders had a capacity of 3,500 imperial gallons (15,900 litres; 4,200 US gallons).
