= South African type XF tender =

Steam locomotive tender from the pre-Union era in Transvaal

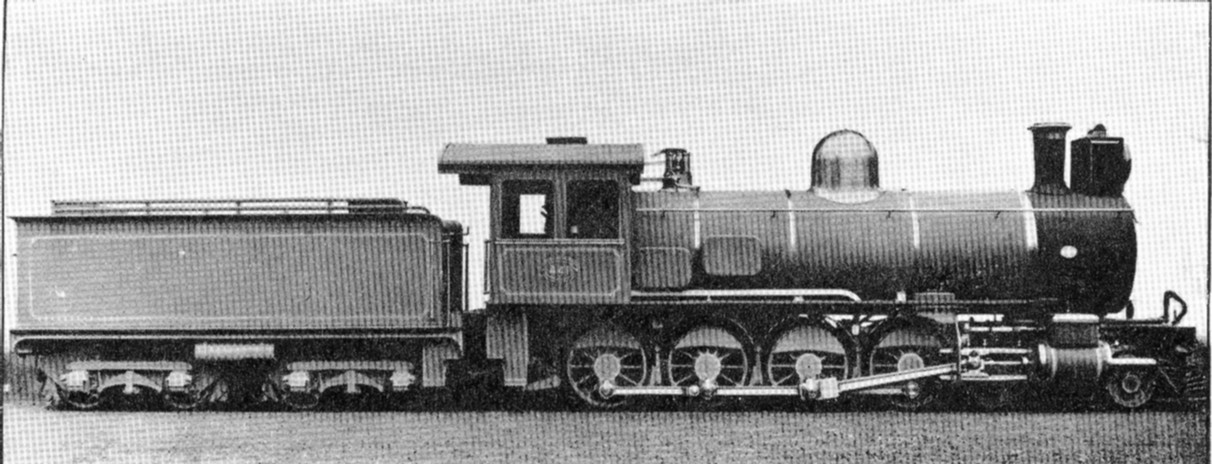
- Type XF tender (6 LT) on CSAR Class 8-L2
Type and origin
- ♠ 6 long tons coal capacity ♥ 10 long tons coal capacity ♣ 11¾ long tons coal capacity
- Locomotive: ♥ IMR 8th Class ♥ CGR 8th Class of 1902 (3rd) ♥ CSAR Class 8-L2 ♥ CSAR Class 8-L3 ♥ CGR 8th Class of 1904 ♠ SAR Class ME
- Designer: Cape Government Railways (H.M. Beatty)
- Builder: ♥ Neilson, Reid and Company ♠♥ North British Locomotive Co. ♥ Sharp, Stewart and Company ♥ South African Railways
- In service: ♠♥ 1902-1912
- Rebuilt from: ♥♣ Types XC, XD, XE1
- Rebuilder: South African Railways
- Rebuild date: c. 1925
Specifications
- Configuration: 2-axle bogies
- Gauge: 3 ft 6 in (1,067 mm) Cape gauge
- Length: 22 ft 3 1/8 in (6,785 mm)
- Wheel dia.: 33 1/2 in (851 mm) as built 34 in (864 mm) retyred
- Wheelbase: 14 ft 7 in (4,445 mm)
  - Bogie: 4 ft 7 in (1,397 mm)
- Axle load: ♠ 9 LT 14 cwt (9,856 kg) ♥ 11 LT 3 cwt 2 qtr (11,350 kg) ♣ 12 LT 1 cwt (12,240 kg)
  - Front bogie: ♠ 18 LT 4 cwt (18,490 kg) ♥♣ 20 LT 14 cwt (21,030 kg)
  - Rear bogie: ♠ 19 LT 8 cwt (19,710 kg) ♥ 22 LT 7 cwt (22,710 kg) ♣ 24 LT 2 cwt (24,490 kg)
- Weight empty: ♥ 44,032 lb (19,973 kg)
- Weight w/o: ♠ 37 LT 12 cwt (38,200 kg) ♥ 43 LT 1 cwt (43,740 kg) ♣ 44 LT 16 cwt (45,520 kg)
- Fuel type: Coal
- Fuel cap.: ♠ 6 LT (6.1 t) ♥ 10 LT (10.2 t) ♣ 11 LT 15 cwt (11.9 t)
- Water cap.: ♠♥♣ 3,000 imp gal (13,600 L)
- Stoking: Manual
- Couplers: Drawbar & Johnston link-and-pin Drawbar & AAR knuckle (1930s)
Career
- Operators: Imperial Military Railways; Cape Government Railways; Central South African Railways; South African Railways
- Numbers: SAR 1082-1191, 1234-1243, 1618

The South African type XF tender was a steam locomotive tender from the pre-Union era in Transvaal.

Type XF tenders first entered service in 1902, as tenders to the 8th Class 4-8-0 Mastodon type steam locomotives which were acquired by the Imperial Military Railways in that year. These locomotives were designated Class 8A on the South African Railways in 1912.

== Manufacturers ==
Type XF tenders were built between 1901 and 1912 by Neilson, Reid and Company, North British Locomotive Company and Sharp, Stewart and Company.

The original 8th Class locomotive and tender was designed in 1901 by H.M. Beatty, Chief Locomotive Superintendent of the Cape Government Railways (CGR), at its Salt River works in Cape Town. The Type XF first entered service in 1902, as tender to the forty 8th Class locomotives which were built for the Imperial Military Railways (IMR) by Neilson, Reid and Sharp, Stewart. The tender's design could therefore possibly be credited to Lieutenant Colonel E.P.C. Girouard KCMG DSO RE, Director of Railways of the IMR. When the Central South African Railways (CSAR) was established from the IMR at the end of the Second Boer War, these locomotives were designated Class 8-L1.

== Characteristics ==
As built, the tenders had a coal capacity of 6 long tons (6.1 tonnes). By 1941, most of them had their coal bunkers enlarged, either by having their bunker sides raised or by being rebuilt with a completely new upper structure mounted on their original frames. At that stage, only tender no. 1618, which entered service with the sole Class ME locomotive in 1912, was still on record with its as-built coal capacity and a maximum axle load of 9 long tons 14 hundredweight (9,856 kilograms).

== Locomotives ==
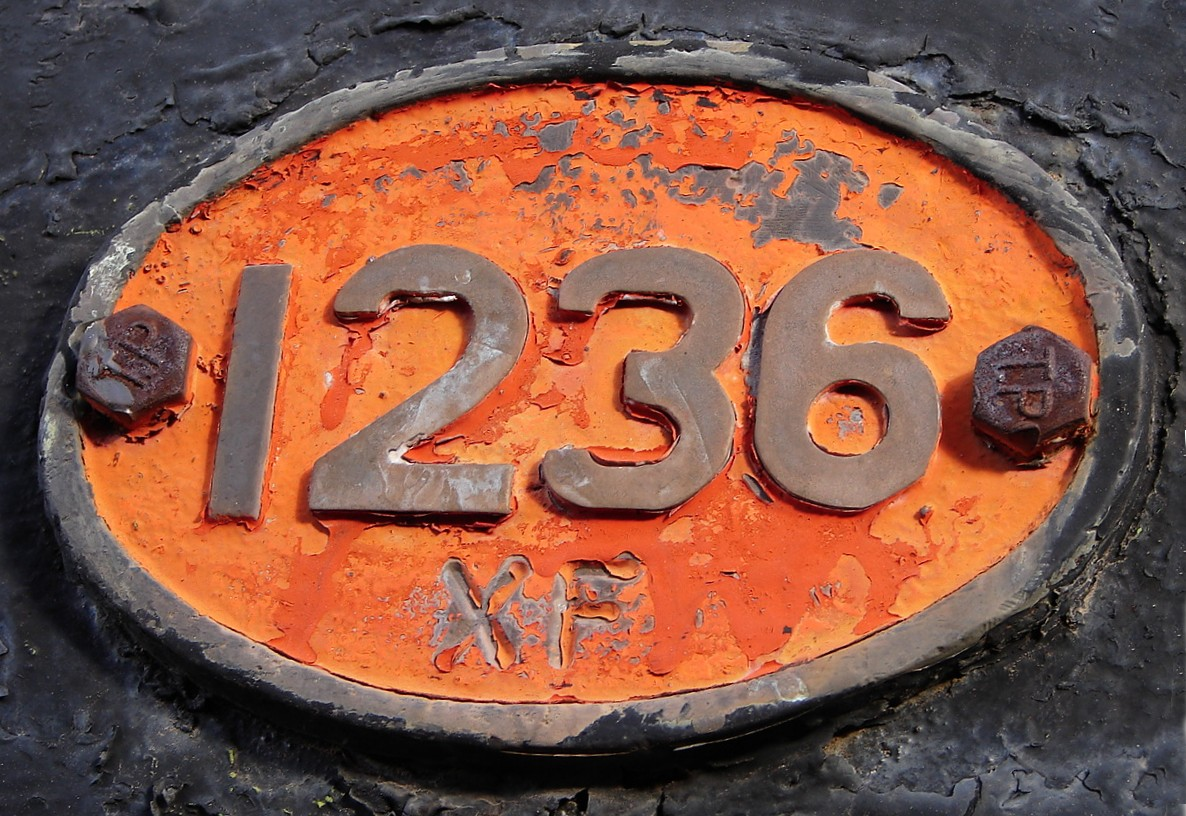
Type XF tender plate, SAR Class 8F

In the SAR years, tenders were numbered for the engines they were delivered with. In most cases, an oval number plate bearing the engine number and often also the tender type, would be attached to the rear end of the tender. During the classification and renumbering of locomotives onto the SAR roster in 1912, no separate classification and renumbering list was published for tenders, which should have been renumbered according to the locomotive renumbering list.

Six locomotive classes were delivered new with Type XF tenders, built by three manufacturers. Bearing in mind that tenders could and did migrate between engines, the tenders should have been numbered in the SAR number ranges as shown.

- 1902: IMR 8th Class, SAR Class 8A, numbers 1092 to 1131.
- 1903: CGR 8th Class of 1902, SAR Class 8, third batch, numbers 1082 to 1091.
- 1903: CSAR Class 8-L2, SAR Class 8B, numbers 1132 to 1161.
- 1903: CSAR Class 8-L3, SAR Class 8C, numbers 1162 to 1191.
- 1904: CGR 8th Class of 1904, SAR Class 8F, numbers 1234 to 1243.
- 1912: SAR Class ME, number 1618.

== Classification letters ==
Since many tender types are interchangeable between different locomotive classes and types, a tender classification system was adopted by the SAR. The first letter of the tender type indicates the classes of engines to which it can be coupled. The "X_" tenders could be used with the locomotive classes as shown.

- CGR Mountain, SAR Class 4.
- SAR Class 4A.
- SAR Class 5.
- CGR 6th Class of 1897, SAR Class 6B.
- Oranje-Vrijstaat Gouwerment-Spoorwegen 6th Class L3, SAR Class 6E.
- CGR 6th Class of 1901 (Neilson, Reid), SAR Class 6H.
- CGR 6th Class of 1902, SAR Class 6J.
- CGR 8th Class of 1902, SAR Class 8.
- IMR 8th Class, SAR Class 8A.
- CSAR Class 8-L2, SAR Class 8B.
- CSAR Class 8-L3, SAR Class 8C.
- CGR 8th Class 4-8-0 of 1903, SAR Class 8D.
- CGR 8th Class Experimental, SAR Class 8E.
- CGR 8th Class 4-8-0 of 1904, SAR Class 8F.
- CGR 8th Class 2-8-0 of 1903, SAR Class 8Y.
- CGR 8th Class 2-8-0 of 1904, SAR Class 8Z.
- CSAR Class 9, SAR Class 9.
- CSAR Class 10, SAR Class 10.
- CSAR Class 10-2 Saturated, SAR Class 10A.
- CSAR Class 10-2 Superheated. SAR Class 10B.
- CSAR Class 10-C, SAR Class 10C.
- CSAR Class 11, SAR Class 11.
- CGR 9th Class of 1903, SAR Class Experimental 4.
- CGR 9th Class of 1906, SAR Class Experimental 5.
- CGR 10th Class, SAR Class Experimental 6.
- SAR Class ME.
- CSAR Mallet Superheated, SAR Class MF.

The second letter indicates the tender's water capacity. The "_F" tenders had a capacity of 3,000 imperial gallons (13,600 litres; 3,600 US gallons).

A number, when added after the letter code, indicates differences between similar tender types, such as function, wheelbase or coal bunker capacity.

== Modifications and rebuilding ==
Since SAR tender type classification is based on the classes of engines to which it can be coupled and its water capacity, tenders of the same type can be completely different in appearance, which makes it difficult to identify many tender types by physical appearance alone. In the case of the Type XF, some of the tenders were modified after entering service, while some began as other tender types which were later rebuilt with larger capacity water tanks, which reclassified them from those other types to Type XF. As a result, three different versions of the Type XF tender eventually saw service on the SAR, all with the same water capacity of 3,000 imperial gallons (13,600 litres), but with different coal capacities and maximum axle loads.

=== Modifications ===
Compared to builder's pictures, which show the locomotives and tenders as built, pictures of most of these locomotives in service show them with a modified tender with built-up sides to the coal bunker to increase the coal capacity. Early versions of the built-up coal bunker sides were in the form of a slatted open-top cage, made of rectangular steel rods. Later versions were constructed of sheet-metal.

=== Rebuilding ===
From c. 1925, many Type XF tenders were completely rebuilt by the SAR by mounting a new upper structure on the existing underframe, with new water tanks and a larger coal capacity. These rebuilt tenders had a more modern appearance, with flush sides all the way to the top of the coal bunker. They had a coal capacity of 10 long tons (10.2 tonnes) and a maximum axle load of 11 long tons 3 hundredweight 2 quarters (11,350 kilograms), but since their water capacity remained unchanged, they were not reclassified.

A second version of these rebuilt tenders had a coal bunker of which the sides extended further rearwards to immediately ahead of the tank's refill manhole. These tenders had a coal capacity of 11 long tons 15 hundredweight (11.9 tonnes) and a maximum axle load of 12 long tons 1 hundredweight (12,240 kilograms).

=== Rebuilding from Types XC, XD & XE1 ===
Also beginning during the late 1920s and using the same drawings, some redundant Type XC tenders from re-tendered Class 10C locomotives, some Type XD tenders from Classes 6H, 6J and 8, and some Type XE1 tenders from Classes 8, 8D, 8E, 8F, 8Y, 8Z and Experimental 4, were also rebuilt with new upper structures on their existing underframes. Since their new tanks increased their water capacity to 3,000 imperial gallons (13,600 litres), these tenders were reclassified to Type XF.

The program to rebuild several older tender types with new upper structures was begun by Col F.R. Collins DSO, who approved several of the detailed drawings for the work during his term in office as Chief Mechanical Engineer of the SAR from 1922 to 1929. It was continued by his successor, A.G. Watson.

== Illustration ==
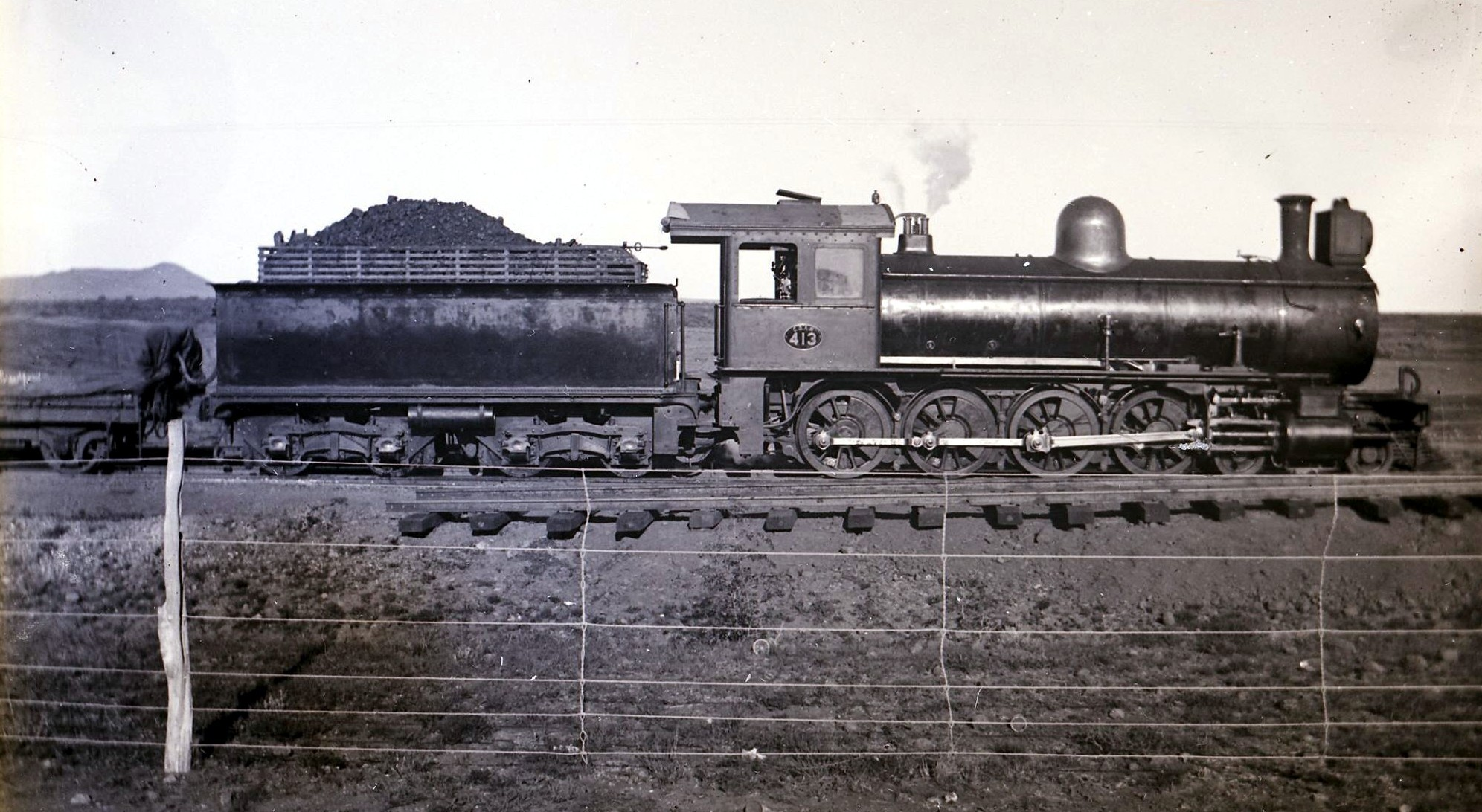
Type XF with slatted bunker extension on CSAR Class 8-L1, c. 1910

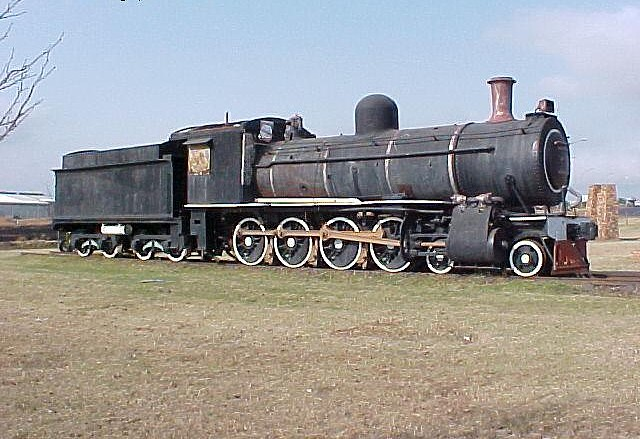
Type XF with sheet-metal extension on Class 8A, 2005

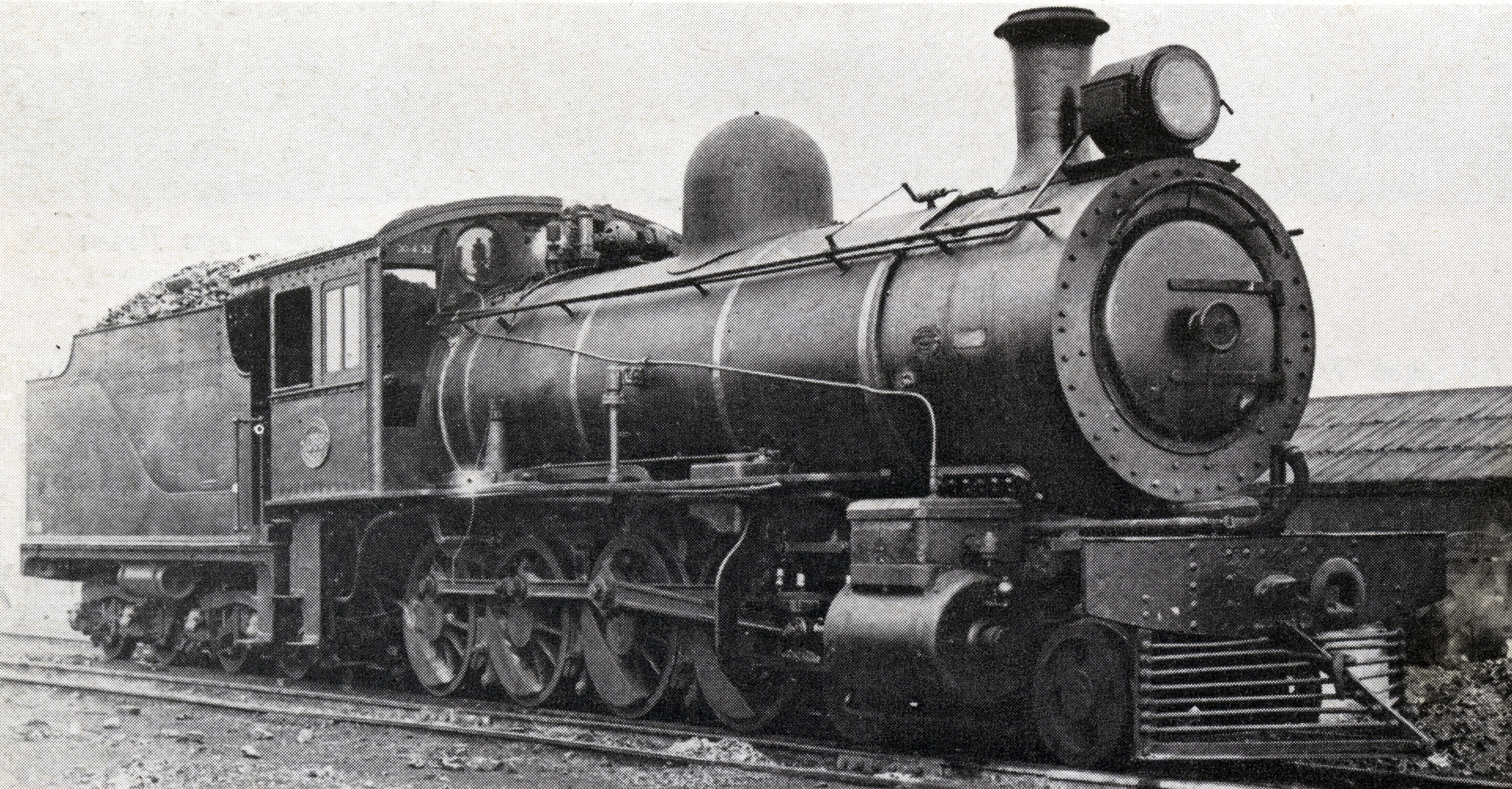
Rebuilt Type XF tender with 10 long tons (10.2 tonnes) coal capacity on Class 8, c. 1930

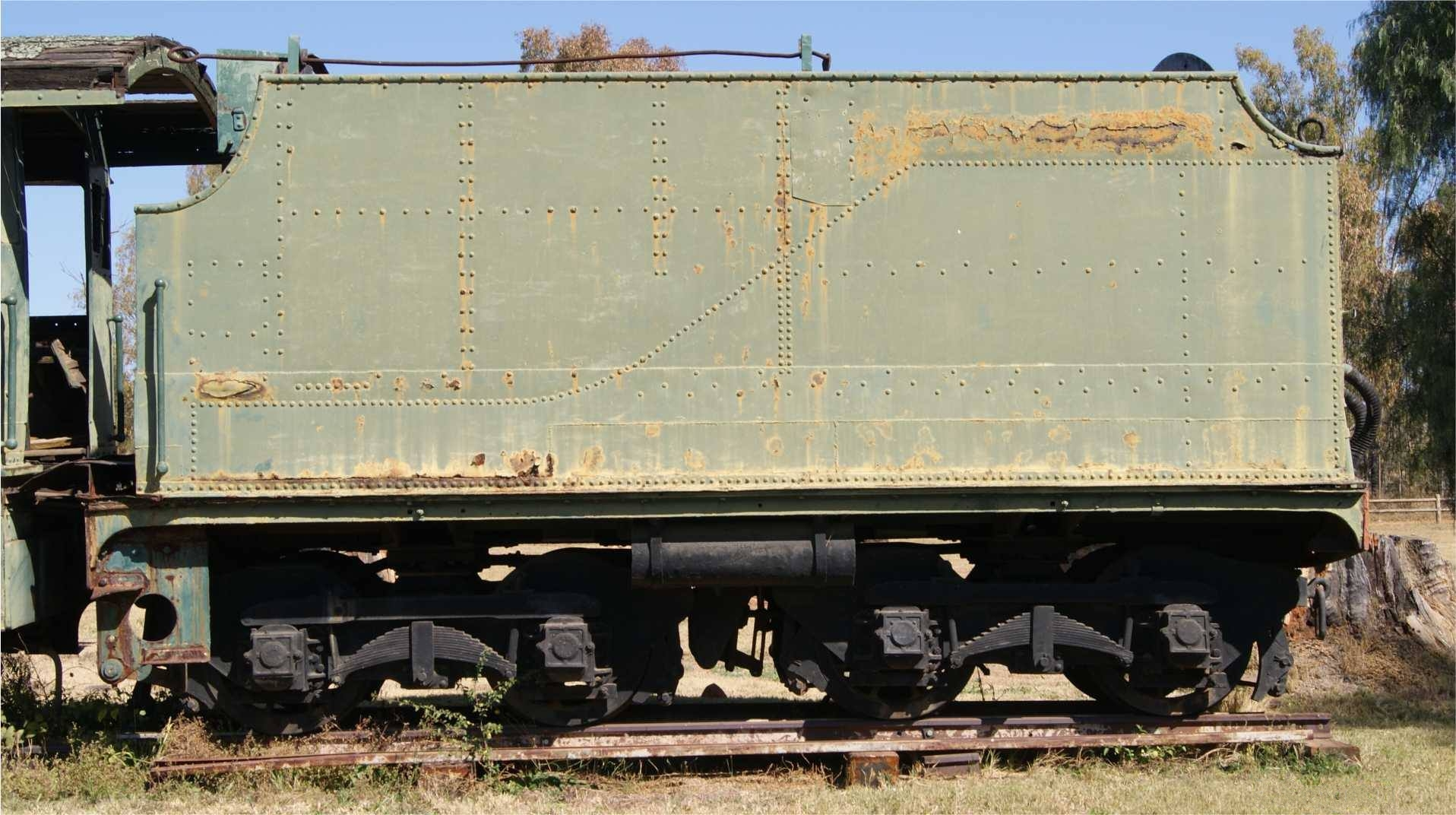
Rebuilt Type XF no. 1175, with 11 long tons 15 hundredweight (11.9 tonnes) coal capacity
