= South African Class ME 2-6-6-2 =

1912 articulated steam locomotive

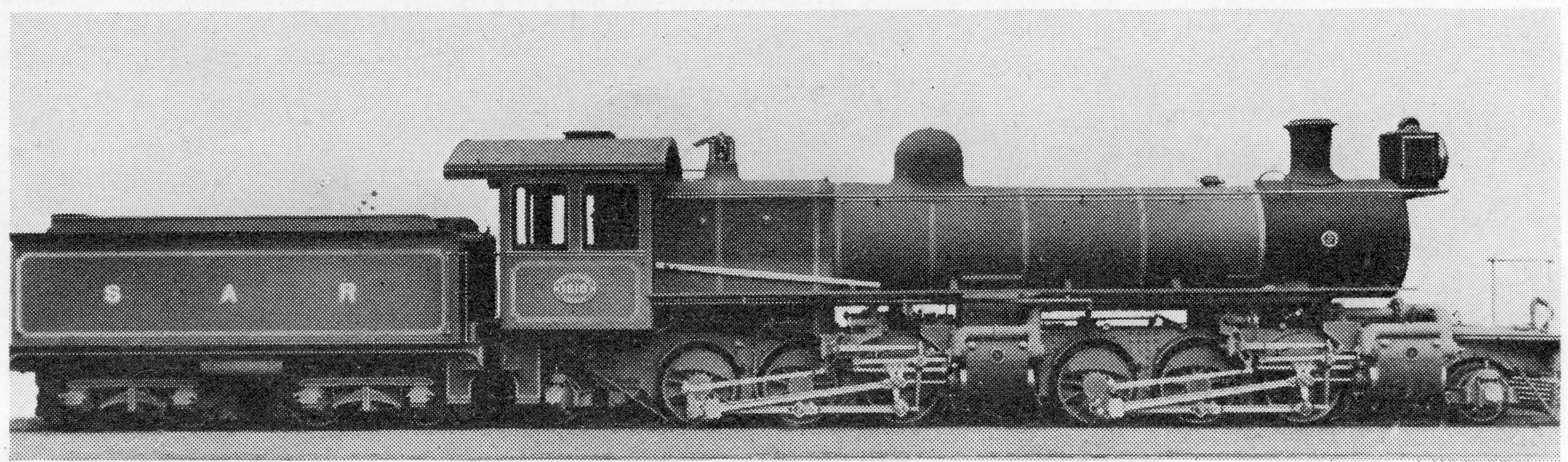
- Class ME no. 1618, c. 1912
Type and origin
- Power type: Steam
- Designer: North British Locomotive Company
- Builder: North British Locomotive Company
- Serial number: 19355
- Model: CSAR Mallet
- Build date: 1912
- Total produced: 1
Specifications
- Configuration
  - Whyte: 2-6-6-2 (Prairie Mallet)
  - UIC: (1'C)C1'h4
- Driver: 3rd & 6th coupled axles
- Gauge: 3 ft 6 in (1,067 mm) Cape gauge
- Leading dia.: 30 in (762 mm)
- Coupled dia.: 42 1/4 in (1,073 mm)
- Trailing dia.: 30 in (762 mm)
- Tender wheels: 34 in (864 mm)
- Wheelbase: 58 ft 5 1/2 in (17,818 mm)
  - Engine: 38 ft 3 in (11,659 mm)
  - Coupled: 8 ft 6 in (2,591 mm) per unit
  - Tender: 14 ft 7 in (4,445 mm)
  - Tender bogie: 4 ft 7 in (1,397 mm)
- Length
  - Over couplers: 66 ft 7 3/8 in (20,304 mm)
- Height: 12 ft 10 in (3,912 mm)
- Frame type: Plate
- Axle load: 9 LT 18 cwt (10,060 kg)
  - Leading: 6 LT (6,096 kg)
  - Coupled: 9 LT 18 cwt (10,060 kg)
  - Trailing: 6 LT 14 cwt (6,808 kg)
  - Tender bogie: Bogie 1: 18 LT 4 cwt (18,490 kg); Bogie 2: 19 LT 8 cwt (19,710 kg)
  - Tender axle: 9 LT 14 cwt (9,856 kg)
- Adhesive weight: 59 LT 8 cwt (60,350 kg)
- Loco weight: 72 LT 2 cwt (73,260 kg)
- Tender weight: 37 LT 12 cwt (38,200 kg)
- Total weight: 109 LT 14 cwt (111,500 kg)
- Tender type: XF (2-axle bogies)
- Fuel type: Coal
- Fuel capacity: 6 LT (6.1 t)
- Water cap.: 3,000 imp gal (13,600 L)
- Firebox
  - Type: Belpaire
  - Grate area: 32 sq ft (3.0 m^{2})
- Boiler
  - Pitch: 7 ft 9 in (2,362 mm)
  - Diameter: 4 ft 1 3/4 in (1,264 mm)
  - Tube plates: 18 ft 6 1/2 in (5,652 mm)
  - Small tubes: 90: 2 1/4 in (57 mm)
  - Large tubes: 14: 5 1/4 in (133 mm)
- Boiler pressure: 170 psi (1,172 kPa)
- Safety valve: Ramsbottom
- Heating surface
  - Firebox: 115 sq ft (10.7 m^{2})
  - Tubes: 1,340 sq ft (124 m^{2})
  - Total surface: 1,455 sq ft (135.2 m^{2})
- Superheater
  - Type: Schmidt
  - Heating area: 346 sq ft (32.1 m^{2})
- Cylinders: Four
- Cylinder size: 15 in (381 mm) bore 23 in (584 mm) stroke
- Valve gear: Walschaerts
- Valve type: Piston
- Couplers: Johnston link-and-pin
Performance figures
- Tractive effort: 31,230 lbf (138.9 kN) @ 50%
Career
- Operators: South African Railways
- Class: Class ME
- Number in class: 1
- Numbers: 1618
- Delivered: 1912
- First run: 1912
- Withdrawn: 1937

The South African Railways Class ME 2-6-6-2 of 1912 was a steam locomotive.

In January 1912, the South African Railways placed a single Class ME Mallet articulated steam locomotive with a 2-6-6-2 wheel arrangement in service.

== Manufacturer ==
During 1911, the Central South African Railways (CSAR) placed an order for a single experimental simple expansion Mallet articulated steam locomotive with the North British Locomotive Company (NBL). The locomotive was intended for test purposes on branch lines with light 45 pounds per yard (22 kilograms per metre) rail.

By the time it was delivered in January 1912, the CSAR had already become part of the newly established South African Railways (SAR). The locomotive was therefore classified as the sole Class ME and numbered 1618 on the SAR roster.

== Characteristics ==
Having been built for branch line working, the engine's maximum axle load was 9 long tons 18 hundredweight (10,060 kilograms) and it was delivered with the 6 long tons (6.1 tonnes) coal capacity version of the Type XF tender. Its Belpaire firebox extended over the second and third coupled wheels of the rear engine unit.

Compared to other Mallet locomotives which were placed in service during the first decade of the SAR's existence, the Class ME was unique in being arranged as a simple expansion (simplex) locomotive with four high-pressure cylinders instead of the more usual compound expansion arrangement of two high-pressure and two low-pressure cylinders.

The cylinders were arranged outside the plate frames and the 6 inches (152 millimetres) diameter trick-ported piston valves, designed for inside admission, were actuated by Walschaerts valve gear. Each engine unit was equipped with an independent Wakefield mechanical lubricator to supply oil to the valves and pistons.

The comparatively low boiler pressure of 170 pounds per square inch (1,172 kilopascals) is indicative of the opinion held at the time that the economies to be gained from superheating did not require high boiler pressure. The boiler was equipped with a Schmidt superheater. Steam distribution to the four cylinders was rather unique, being led from the superheater header in the smokebox to a steam collector box which was arranged between the two cylinders of the rear engine unit, from where a branch was led to the cylinders of the front engine unit by a central steam pipe with flexible joints, since this engine unit could move sideways in relation to the boiler barrel. This pipe took the place of the usual receiver pipe on compound Mallets.

The blast pipe had separate outlets for the exhaust steam from each engine unit, with the rear engine unit's exhaust feeding through an annulus arranged around the exhaust from the front engine unit. A device was installed by which either engine unit could be cut out whilst running so that steam could be admitted to one pair of cylinders only when running light engine.

== Service ==
The Class ME proved to be successful in operation and, even though it was acquired as an experimental locomotive, remained in service for 25 years. It spent its last years working on the line from Nelspruit to Sabie in the Eastern Transvaal Lowveld, until it was withdrawn and scrapped in 1937.

== Illustration ==
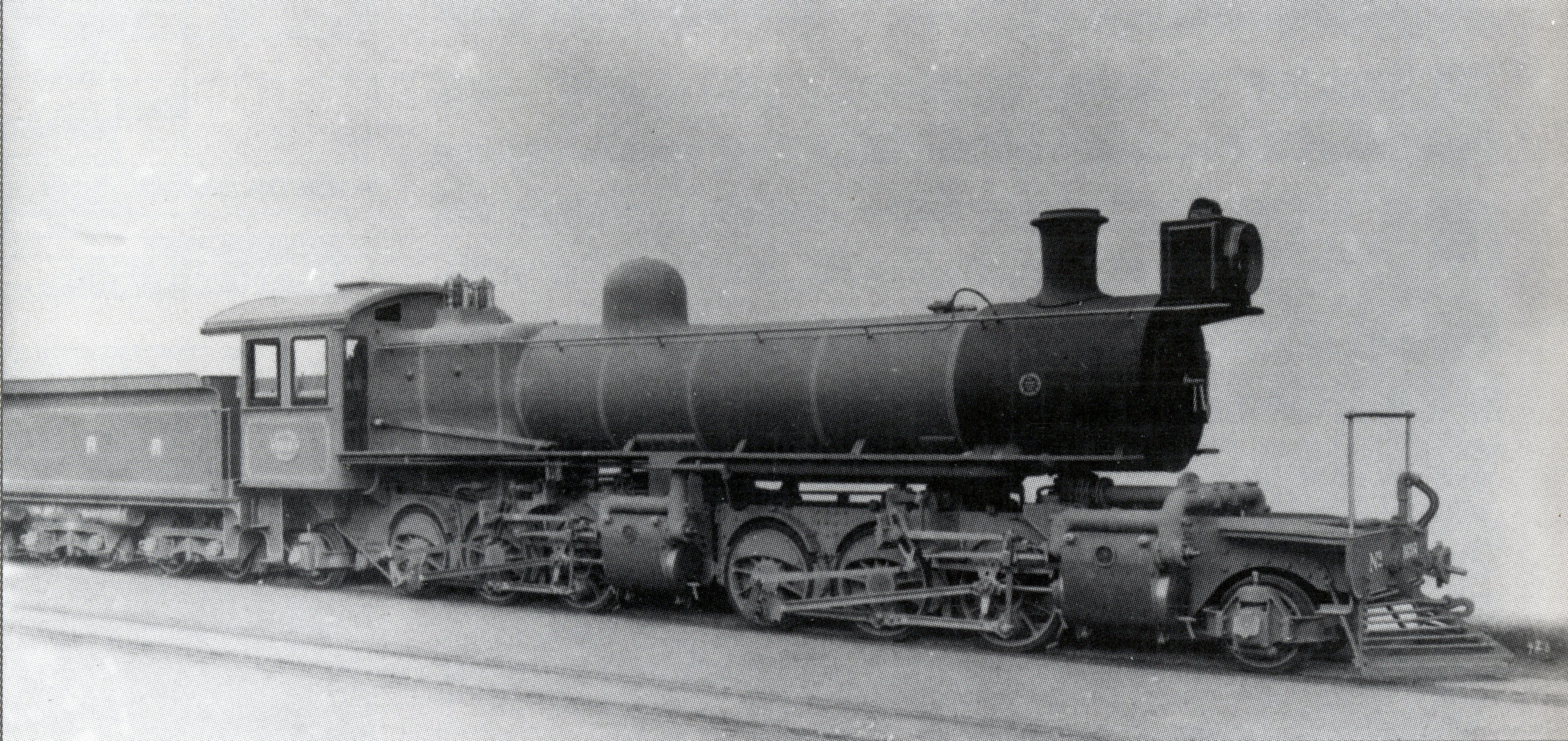
Builder's works picture of no. 1618
