= Central South African Railways =

Railway operator

Rail network of the Central South African Railways in 1910, immediately before the creation of the Union of South Africa

The Central South African Railways (CSAR) was from 1902 to 1910 the operator of public railways in the Transvaal Colony and Orange River Colony in what is now South Africa. During the Anglo-Boer War, as British forces moved into the territory of the Orange Free State and the South African Republic, the Orange Free State Government Railways, the Netherlands-South African Railway Company and the Pretoria-Pietersburg Railway were taken over by the Imperial Military Railways under Lieutenant-Colonel Sir Percy Girouard.

After the war had ended, the Imperial Military Railways became the Central South African Railways in July 1902, with Thomas Rees Price as general manager. With the creation of the Union of South Africa in 1910, the CSAR was merged with the Cape Government Railways and the Natal Government Railways to form the South African Railways, which is now Transnet Freight Rail.
