= South African type XM tender =

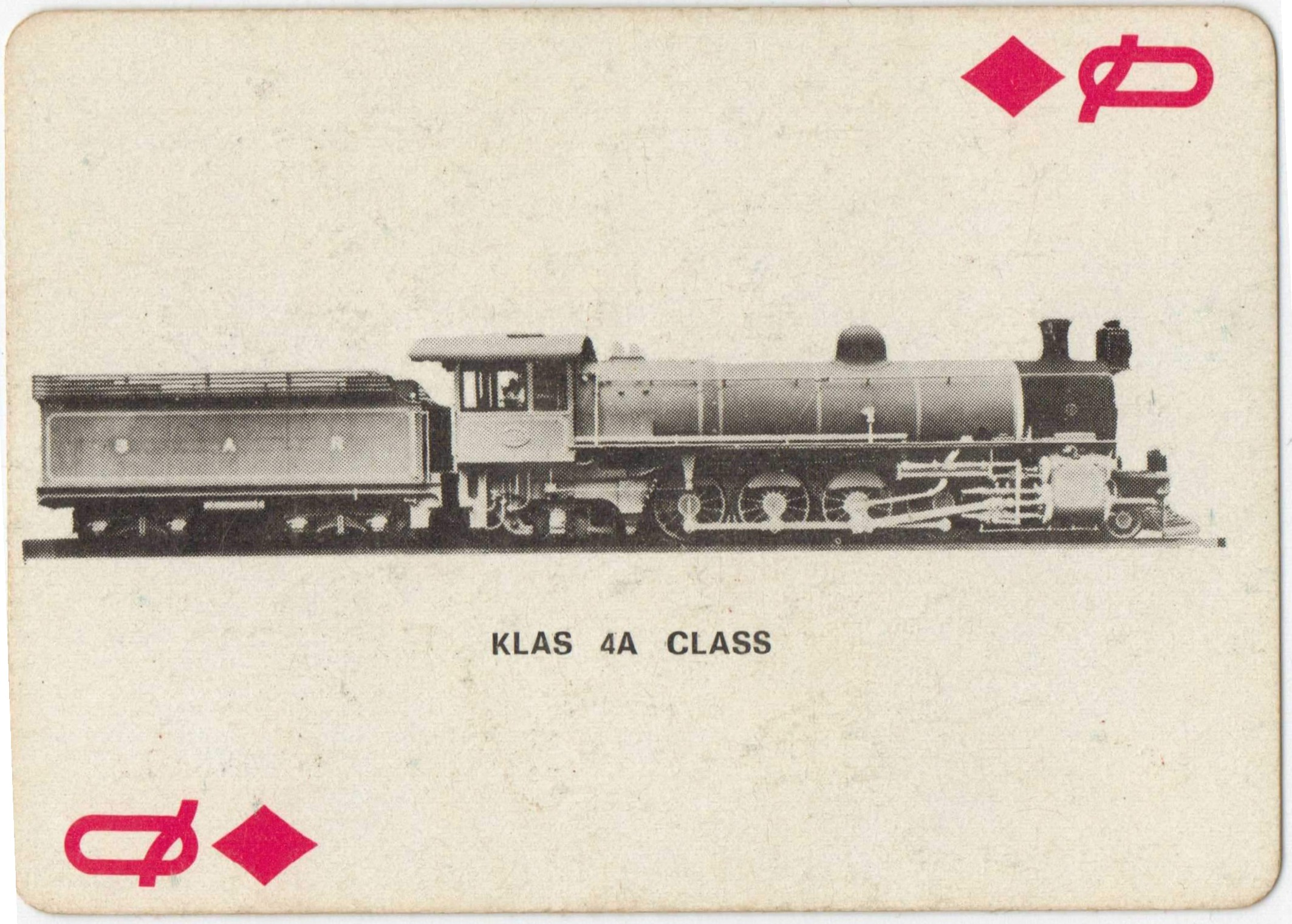
- Type XM tender on Class 4A
Type and origin
- Locomotive: Class 4A
- Designer: Cape Government Railways (H.M. Beatty)
- Builder: North British Locomotive Company
- In service: 1913-1914
Specifications
- Configuration: 2-axle bogies
- Gauge: 3 ft 6 in (1,067 mm) Cape gauge
- Length: 25 ft 1 in (7,645 mm)
- Wheel dia.: 33 1/2 in (851 mm) as built 34 in (864 mm) retyred
- Wheelbase: 16 ft 1 in (4,902 mm)
  - Bogie: 4 ft 7 in (1,397 mm)
- Axle load: 11 LT 18 cwt (12,090 kg)
  - Front bogie: 23 LT 9 cwt (23,830 kg)
  - Rear bogie: 23 LT 16 cwt (24,180 kg)
- Weight empty: 47,920 lb (21,740 kg)
- Weight w/o: 47 LT 5 cwt (48,010 kg)
- Fuel type: Coal
- Fuel cap.: 8 LT (8.1 t)
- Water cap.: 4,000 imp gal (18,200 L)
- Stoking: Manual
- Couplers: Drawbar & Johnston link-and-pin Drawbar & AAR knuckle (1930s)
Career
- Operators: South African Railways
- Numbers: SAR 1551-1560

The South African type XM tender was a steam locomotive tender.

Ten Type XM tenders entered service in 1913, as tenders to the Class 4A 4-8-2 Mountain type steam locomotives which were acquired by the South African Railways in that year.

== Manufacturer ==
Type XM tenders were built by the North British Locomotive Company in 1913.

The original Class 4 Mountain type locomotive was designed as a heavy mixed traffic locomotive by H.M. Beatty, the last Chief Locomotive Superintendent of the Cape Government Railways (CGR), at the Salt River shops. Soon after the South African Railways (SAR) locomotive renumbering project was implemented in 1912, an order was placed with North British for a further ten locomotives of this type. They were delivered late in 1913 and were designated Class 4A. The Type XM entered service as tenders to these engines.

== Characteristics ==
The Type XM tender had a coal capacity of 8 long tons (8.1 tonnes), a water capacity of 4,000 imperial gallons (18,200 litres) and a maximum axle loading of 11 long tons 18 hundredweight (12,090 kilograms).

== Locomotive ==
In the SAR years, tenders were numbered for the engines they were delivered with. In most cases, an oval number plate, bearing the engine number and often also the tender type, would be attached to the rear end of the tender. Only the ten Class 4A locomotives were delivered new with Type XM tenders, numbered in the SAR number range from 1551 to 1560.

== Classification letters ==
Since many tender types are interchangeable between different locomotive classes and types, a tender classification system was adopted by the SAR. The first letter of the tender type indicates the classes of engines to which it could be coupled. The "X_" tenders could be used with the locomotive classes as shown.

- CGR Mountain, SAR Class 4.
- SAR Class 4A.
- SAR Class 5.
- CGR 6th Class of 1897, SAR Class 6B.
- Oranje-Vrijstaat Gouwerment-Spoorwegen 6th Class L3, SAR Class 6E.
- CGR 6th Class of 1901 (Neilson, Reid), SAR Class 6H.
- CGR 6th Class of 1902, SAR Class 6J.
- CGR 8th Class of 1902, SAR Class 8.
- Imperial Military Railways 8th Class, SAR Class 8A.
- Central South African Railways Class 8-L2, SAR Class 8B.
- Central South African Railways Class 8-L3, SAR Class 8C.
- CGR 8th Class 4-8-0 of 1903, SAR Class 8D.
- CGR 8th Class Experimental, SAR Class 8E.
- CGR 8th Class 4-8-0 of 1904, SAR Class 8F.
- CGR 8th Class 2-8-0 of 1903, SAR Class 8Y.
- CGR 8th Class 2-8-0 of 1904, SAR Class 8Z.
- Central South African Railways Class 9, SAR Class 9.
- Central South African Railways Class 10, SAR Class 10.
- Central South African Railways Class 10-2 Saturated, SAR Class 10A.
- Central South African Railways Class 10-2 Superheated. SAR Class 10B.
- Central South African Railways Class 10-C, SAR Class 10C.
- Central South African Railways Class 11, SAR Class 11.
- CGR 9th Class of 1903, SAR Class Experimental 4.
- CGR 9th Class of 1906, SAR Class Experimental 5.
- CGR 10th Class, SAR Class Experimental 6.
- SAR Class ME.
- Central South African Railways Mallet Superheated, SAR Class MF.

The second letter indicates the tender's water capacity. The "_M" tenders had a capacity of 4,000 imperial gallons (18,200 litres; 4,800 US gallons).

A number, when added after the letter code, usually indicates differences between similar tender types, such as function, wheelbase or coal bunker capacity.

== Modification ==
Pictures of most of these locomotives in service show them with a modified tender with built-up sides to the coal bunker to increase the coal capacity. Early versions of the built-up coal bunker sides were in the form of a slatted open-top cage, made of rectangular steel rods. Later versions were constructed of sheet-metal.

== Illustration ==
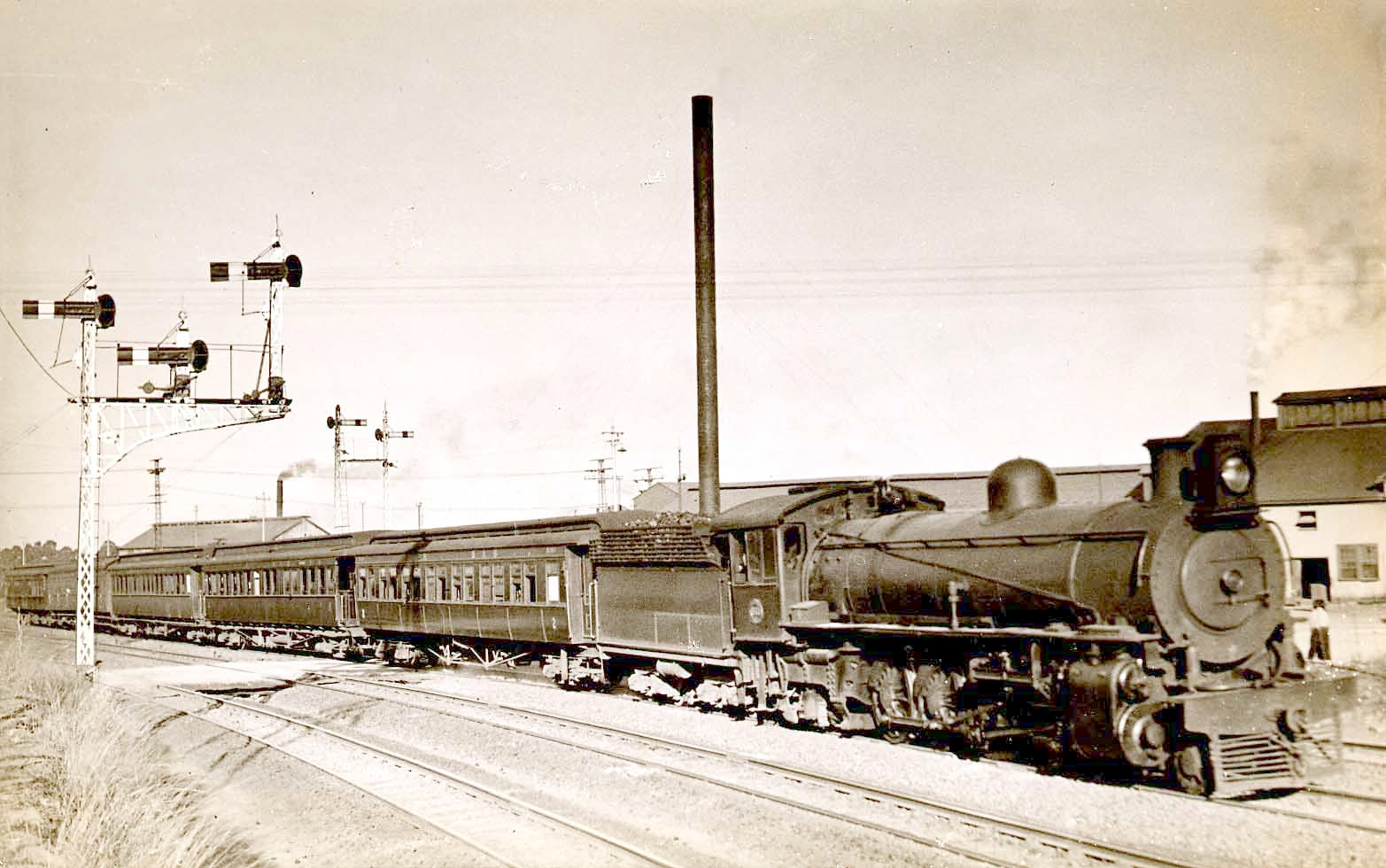
Type XM with slatted top on Class 4A, c. 1930

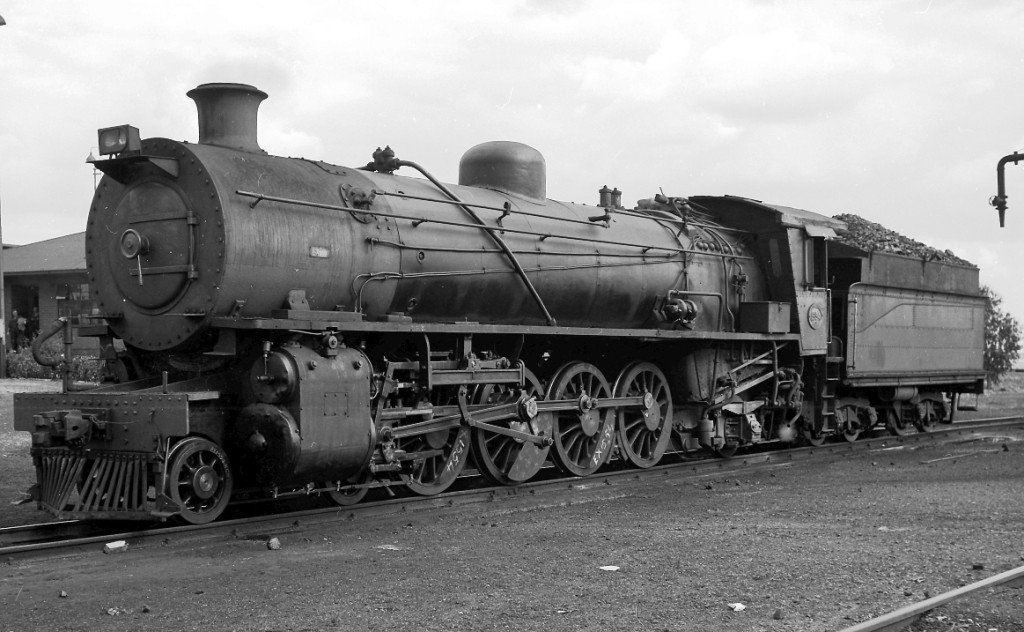
Type XM with sheet-metal top on Class 4A, 8 April 1966
