= South African type XF2 tender =

Steam locomotive tender in South Africa

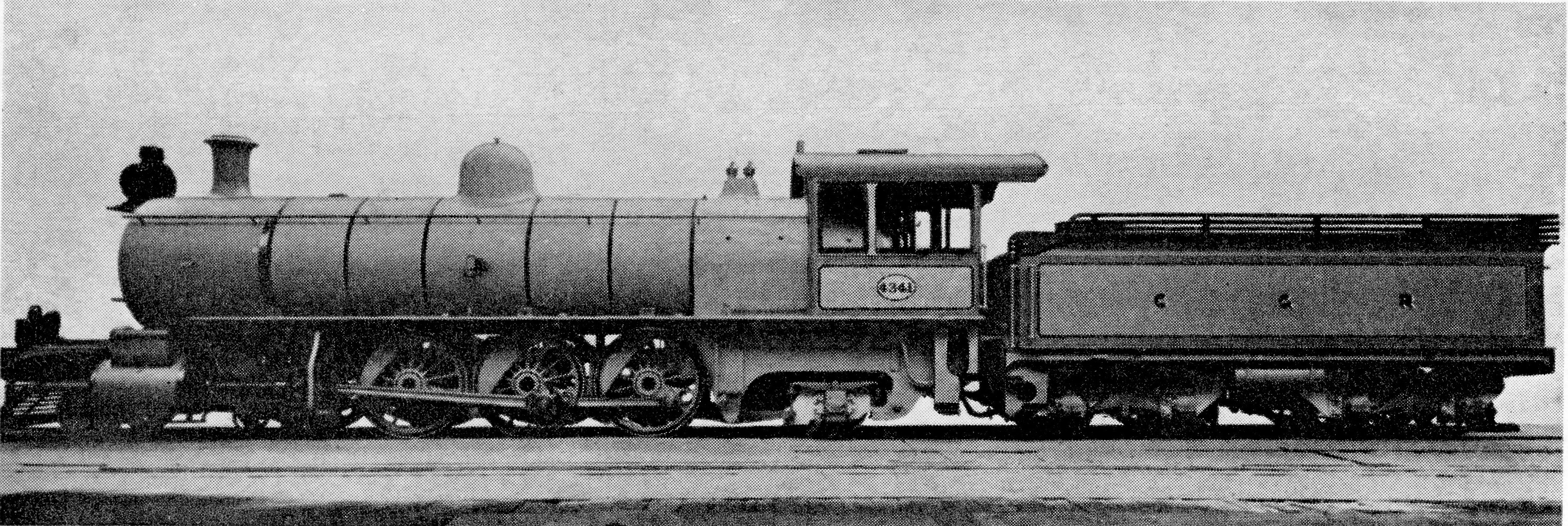
- Type XF2 (7½ LT) on CGR 9th Class, c. 1906
Type and origin
- ♠ 7½ long tons coal capacity ♥ 10 long tons coal capacity
- Locomotive: ♠ CGR 9th Class of 1906 ♥ CGR 10th Class
- Designer: Cape Government Railways (H.M. Beatty)
- Builder: Kitson and Company
- In service: 1906
Specifications
- Configuration: 2-axle bogies
- Gauge: 3 ft 6 in (1,067 mm) Cape gauge
- Length: 23 ft 7 7/8 in (7,210 mm)
- Wheel dia.: 33 1/2 in (851 mm) as built 34 in (864 mm) retyred
- Wheelbase: 16 ft 1 in (4,902 mm)
  - Bogie: 4 ft 7 in (1,397 mm)
- Axle load: ♠ 9 LT 11 cwt (9,703 kg) ♥ 10 LT 18 cwt (11,070 kg)
  - Front bogie: ♠ 19 LT 2 cwt (19,410 kg) ♥ 20 LT 8 cwt (20,730 kg)
  - Rear bogie: ♠ 20 LT 12 cwt (20,930 kg) ♥ 21 LT 16 cwt (22,150 kg)
- Weight empty: 42,128 lb (19,109 kg)
- Weight w/o: ♠ 39 LT 14 cwt (40,340 kg) ♥ 42 LT 4 cwt (42,880 kg)
- Fuel type: Coal
- Fuel cap.: ♠ 7 LT 10 cwt (7.6 t) ♥ 10 LT (10.2 t)
- Water cap.: ♠♥ 3,000 imp gal (13,600 L)
- Stoking: Manual
- Couplers: Drawbar & Johnston link-and-pin
Career
- Operators: Cape Government Railways; South African Railways
- Numbers: ♠ SAR 948 - ♥ SAR 1244

The South African type XF2 tender was a steam locomotive tender from the pre-Union era in the Cape of Good Hope.

Two Type XF2 tenders entered service in 1906, as tenders to the 9th Class 2-8-2 Mikado type and 10th Class 4-8-0 Mastodon type experimental steam locomotives, of which one each were acquired by the Cape Government Railways in that year. The two tenders were not identical.

== Manufacturer ==
Both Type XF2 tenders were built in 1906 by Kitson and Company.

The tenders entered service as tenders to the CGR 9th Class and CGR 10th Class of 1906, both experimental locomotives. The locomotives and tenders were designed by H.M. Beatty, the Chief Locomotive Superintendent of the Cape Government Railways (CGR), at the Salt River works in Cape Town.

== Characteristics ==
The two tenders were not identical. The tender of the 9th Class had a coal capacity of 7 long tons 10 hundredweight (7.6 tonnes) and a maximum axle load of 9 long tons 11 hundredweight (9,703 kilograms), while the tender of the 10th Class had a coal capacity of 10 long tons (10.2 tonnes) and a maximum axle load of 10 long tons 18 hundredweight (11,070 kilograms). Both had a water capacity of 3,000 imperial gallons (13,600 litres).

== Locomotives ==
On the South African Railways (SAR) roster, the two locomotives were designated Classes Experimental 5 and Experimental 6 respectively in 1912. In the SAR years, tenders were numbered for the engines they were delivered with. In most cases, an oval number plate, bearing the engine number and often also the tender type, would be attached to the rear end of the tender. During the classification and renumbering of locomotives onto the SAR roster in 1912, no separate classification and renumbering list was published for tenders, which should have been renumbered according to the locomotive renumbering list.

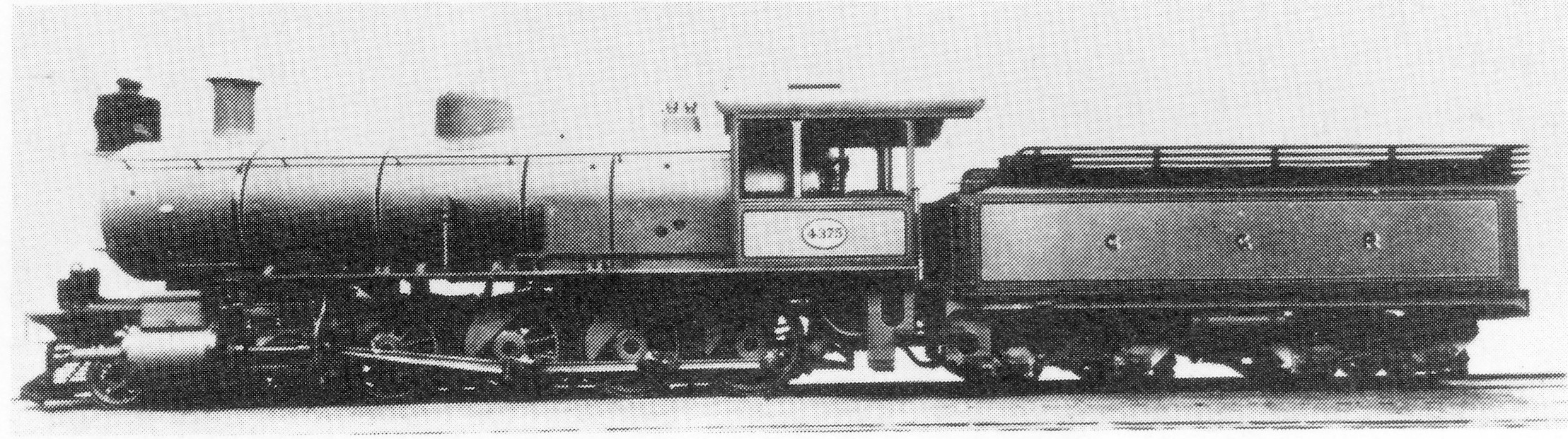
Type XF2 (10 LT) on CGR 10th Class, c. 1906

Only these two experimental locomotives were delivered new with Type XF2 tenders and were renumbered to the SAR numbers as shown.

- 1906: CGR 9th Class of 1906, SAR Class Experimental 5, no. 948.
- 1906: CGR 10th Class, SAR Class Experimental 6, no. 1244.

== Classification letters ==
Since many tender types are interchangeable between different locomotive classes and types, a tender classification system was adopted by the SAR. The first letter of the tender type indicates the classes of engines to which it can be coupled. The "X_" tenders could be used with the following locomotive classes:

- CGR Mountain, SAR Class 4.
- SAR Class 4A.
- SAR Class 5.
- CGR 6th Class of 1897, SAR Class 6B.
- Oranje-Vrijstaat Gouwerment-Spoorwegen 6th Class L3, SAR Class 6E.
- CGR 6th Class of 1901 (Neilson, Reid), SAR Class 6H.
- CGR 6th Class of 1902, SAR Class 6J.
- CGR 8th Class of 1902, SAR Class 8.
- Imperial Military Railways 8th Class, SAR Class 8A.
- Central South African Railways Class 8-L2, SAR Class 8B.
- Central South African Railways Class 8-L3, SAR Class 8C.
- CGR 8th Class 4-8-0 of 1903, SAR Class 8D.
- CGR 8th Class Experimental, SAR Class 8E.
- CGR 8th Class 4-8-0 of 1904, SAR Class 8F.
- CGR 8th Class 2-8-0 of 1903, SAR Class 8Y.
- CGR 8th Class 2-8-0 of 1904, SAR Class 8Z.
- Central South African Railways Class 9, SAR Class 9.
- Central South African Railways Class 10, SAR Class 10.
- Central South African Railways Class 10-2 Saturated, SAR Class 10A.
- Central South African Railways Class 10-2 Superheated. SAR Class 10B.
- Central South African Railways Class 10-C, SAR Class 10C.
- Central South African Railways Class 11, SAR Class 11.
- CGR 9th Class of 1903, SAR Class Experimental 4.
- CGR 9th Class of 1906, SAR Class Experimental 5.
- CGR 10th Class, SAR Class Experimental 6.
- SAR Class ME.
- Central South African Railways Mallet Superheated, SAR Class MF.

The second letter indicates the tender's water capacity. The "_F" tenders had a capacity of 3,000 imperial gallons (13,600 litres; 3,600 US gallons).

A number, when added after the letter code, usually indicates differences between similar tender types, such as function, wheelbase or coal bunker capacity.
