= Cape Government Railways 8th Class locomotives =

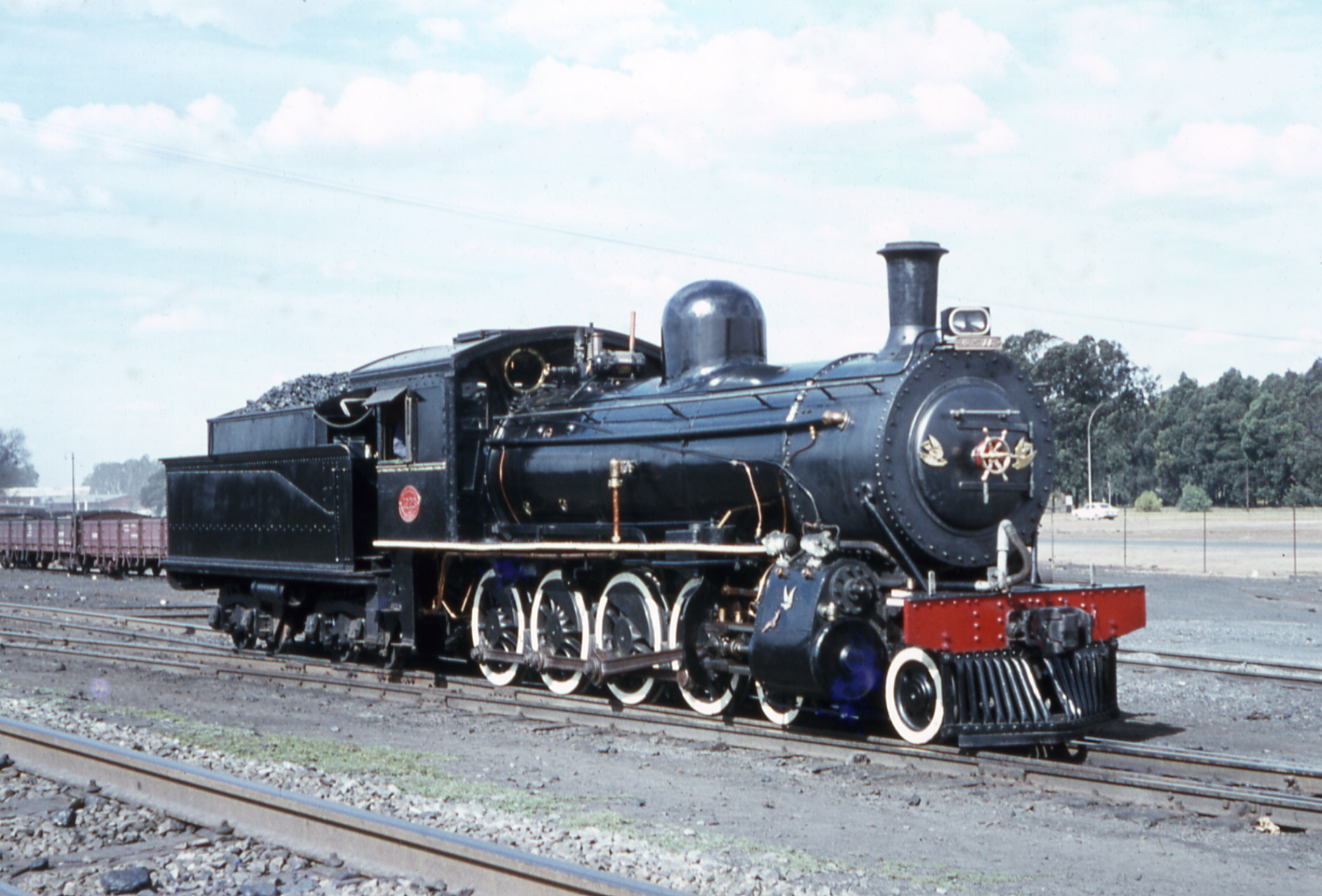
CGR 8th Class 4-8-0 of 1903

The Cape Government Railways 8th Class locomotives include seven locomotive models, all designated 8th Class irrespective of differences in wheel arrangement.

When the Union of South Africa was established on 31 May 1910, the three Colonial government railways (Cape Government Railways, Natal Government Railways and Central South African Railways) were united under a single administration to control and administer the railways, ports and harbours of the Union. In 1912, the Cape Government Railways 8th Class locomotives were grouped into seven different sub-classes on the new South African Railways.

2-8-0 wheel arrangement

- CGR 8th Class 2-8-0 1901 (SAR Class 8X)
- CGR 8th Class 2-8-0 1903 (SAR Class 8Y)
- CGR 8th Class 2-8-0 1904 (SAR Class 8Z)

4-8-0 wheel arrangement

- CGR 8th Class 4-8-0 1902 (SAR Class 8)
- CGR 8th Class 4-8-0 1903 (SAR Class 8D)
- CGR 8th Class 4-8-0 1903 Experimental (SAR Class 8E)
- CGR 8th Class 4-8-0 1904 (SAR Class 8F)
