= South African type XE1 tender =

Steam locomotive tender in South Africa

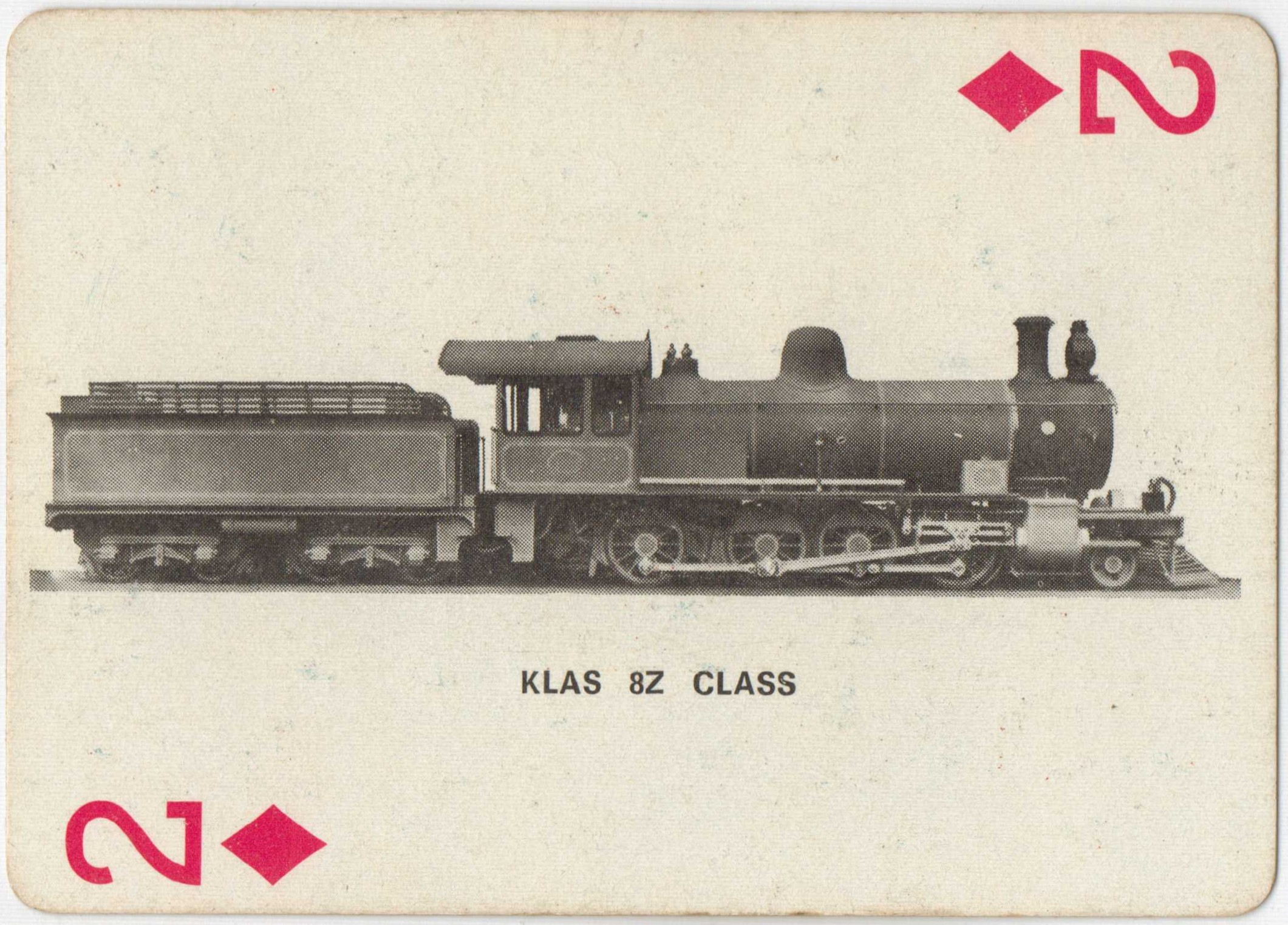
- Type XE1 tender on CGR 8th Class 2-8-0 of 1904
Type and origin
- ♠ 6 long tons coal capacity ♥ 9 long tons coal capacity ♣ 10 long tons coal capacity
- Locomotive: ♣ GGR 8th Class of 1902 (2nd) ♣ CGR 8th Class of 1903 ♣ CGR 8th Class Experimental ♥ CGR 8th Class 2-8-0 of 1903 ♣ CGR 8th Class 2-8-0 of 1904 ♠ CGR 9th Class of 1903
- Designer: Cape Government Railways (H.M. Beatty)
- Builder: ♠♥ Kitson and Company ♣ Neilson, Reid and Company ♣ North British Locomotive Co.
- In service: 1902-1904
- Rebuilder: South African Railways
- Rebuild date: c. 1925
- Rebuilt to: Type XF
Specifications
- Configuration: 2-axle bogies
- Gauge: 3 ft 6 in (1,067 mm) Cape gauge
- Length: 22 ft 1 5/8 in (6,747 mm)
- Wheel dia.: 33 1/2 in (851 mm) as built 34 in (864 mm) retyred
- Wheelbase: 14 ft 7 in (4,445 mm)
  - Bogie: 4 ft 7 in (1,397 mm)
- Axle load: ♠ 9 LT 4 cwt 1 qtr (9,360 kg) av. ♣ 9 LT 8 cwt (9,551 kg)
  - Front bogie: ♣ 17 LT 13 cwt (17,930 kg)
  - Rear bogie: ♣ 18 LT 16 cwt (19,100 kg)
- Weight empty: ♣ 42,234 lb (19,157 kg)
- Weight w/o: ♠ 36 LT 18 cwt (37,490 kg); 37.49 t; 41.33 short tons ♣ 36 LT 9 cwt (37,030 kg); 37.03 t; 40.82 short tons
- Fuel type: Coal
- Fuel cap.: ♠ 6 LT (6.1 t; 6.7 short tons) ♥ 9 LT (9.1 t; 10.1 short tons) ♣ 10 LT (10.2 t; 11.2 short tons)
- Water cap.: ♠♥♣ 2,855 imp gal (13,000 L)
- Stoking: Manual
- Couplers: Drawbar & Johnston link-and-pin Drawbar & AAR knuckle (1930s)
Career
- Operators: Cape Government Railways; South African Railways
- Numbers: ♠ SAR 910-911 ♥ SAR 896-899 ♣ SAR 900-907, 1072-1081, 1192-1233

The South African type XE1 tender was a steam locomotive tender from the pre-Union era in the Cape of Good Hope.

The Type XE1 tender first entered service in 1902, as tenders to the second batch of ten 8th Class 4-8-0 Mastodon type steam locomotives which were acquired by the Cape Government Railways in that year. These locomotives were designated Class 8 on the South African Railways in 1912.

== Manufacturers ==
Type XE1 tenders were built between 1901 and 1904 by Kitson and Company, Neilson, Reid and Company and North British Locomotive Company.

The 8th Class locomotive and tender were designed in 1901 by H.M. Beatty, Chief Locomotive Superintendent of the Cape Government Railways (CGR), at the Salt River works in Cape Town. The Type XE1 first entered service in 1902, as tender to the second batch of ten out of altogether 23 8th Class 4-8-0 Mastodon type locomotives which were built for the CGR by Neilson, Reid and Company. These locomotives were designated Class 8 on the South African Railways (SAR) in 1912.

Until 1904, more were delivered as tenders to five more locomotive types of the CGR, two more 8th Class Mastodon types in 1903 of which one was experimental, the 9th Class 2-8-2 Mikado type in 1903 and two 8th Class 2-8-0 Consolidation types in 1903 and 1904.

== Characteristics ==
Three versions of the Type XE1 tender saw service, all with a water capacity of 2,855 imperial gallons (13,000 litres), but with different coal bunker capacities and different axle loads.

- The four tenders which were delivered with the CGR 8th Class 2-8-0 of 1903, later the SAR Class 8Y, had a coal capacity of 9 long tons (9.1 tonnes).
- The two tenders which were delivered with the CGR 9th Class of 1903, later the SAR Class Experimental 4, had a coal capacity of 6 long tons (6.1 tonnes) and an average maximum axle load of 9 long tons 4 hundredweight 1 quarter (9,360 kilograms).
- All others had a coal capacity of 10 long tons (10.2 tonnes) and a maximum axle load of 9 long tons 8 hundredweight (9,551 kilograms).

== Locomotives ==
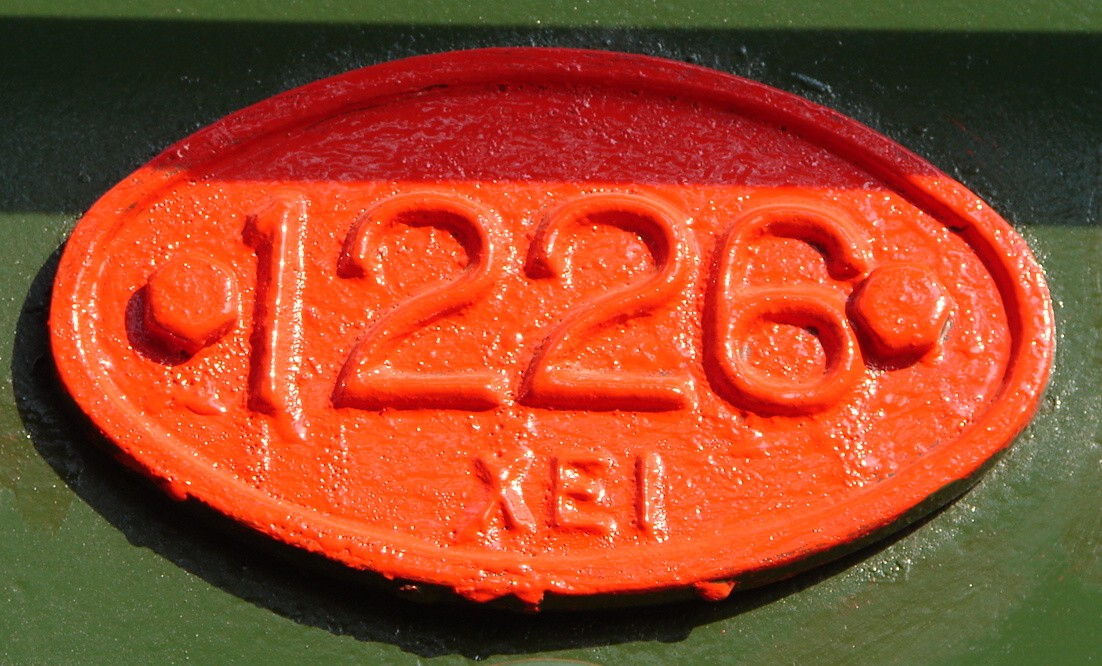
Type XE1 number plate

In the SAR years, tenders were numbered for the engines they were delivered with. In most cases, an oval number plate, bearing the engine number and often also the tender type, would be attached to the rear end of the tender. During the classification and renumbering of locomotives onto the SAR roster in 1912, no separate classification and renumbering list was published for tenders, which should have been renumbered according to the locomotive renumbering list.

Six locomotive classes were delivered new with Type XE1 tenders, built by three manufacturers. Bearing in mind that tenders could and did migrate between engines, the tenders should have been numbered in the SAR number ranges as shown.

- 1902: CGR 8th Class of 1902, SAR Class 8, second batch, numbers 1072 to 1081.
- 1903: CGR 8th Class of 1903, SAR Class 8D, numbers 1192 to 1229.
- 1903: CGR 8th Class Experimental, SAR Class 8E, numbers 1230 to 1233.
- 1903: CGR 8th Class 2-8-0 of 1903, SAR Class 8Y, numbers 896 to 899.
- 1903: CGR 9th Class of 1903, SAR Class Experimental 4, numbers 910 and 911.
- 1904: CGR 8th Class 2-8-0 of 1904, SAR Class 8Z, numbers 900 to 907.

== Classification letters ==
Since many tender types are interchangeable between different locomotive classes and types, a tender classification system was adopted by the SAR. The first letter of the tender type indicates the classes of engines to which it can be coupled. The "X_" tenders could be used with the locomotive classes as shown.

- CGR Mountain, SAR Class 4.
- SAR Class 4A.
- SAR Class 5.
- CGR 6th Class of 1897, SAR Class 6B.
- Oranje-Vrijstaat Gouwerment-Spoorwegen 6th Class L3, SAR Class 6E.
- CGR 6th Class of 1901 (Neilson, Reid), SAR Class 6H.
- CGR 6th Class of 1902, SAR Class 6J.
- CGR 8th Class of 1902, SAR Class 8.
- Imperial Military Railways 8th Class, SAR Class 8A.
- Central South African Railways Class 8-L2, SAR Class 8B.
- Central South African Railways Class 8-L3, SAR Class 8C.
- CGR 8th Class 4-8-0 of 1903, SAR Class 8D.
- CGR 8th Class Experimental, SAR Class 8E.
- CGR 8th Class 4-8-0 of 1904, SAR Class 8F.
- CGR 8th Class 2-8-0 of 1903, SAR Class 8Y.
- CGR 8th Class 2-8-0 of 1904, SAR Class 8Z.
- Central South African Railways Class 9, SAR Class 9.
- Central South African Railways Class 10, SAR Class 10.
- Central South African Railways Class 10-2 Saturated, SAR Class 10A.
- Central South African Railways Class 10-2 Superheated. SAR Class 10B.
- Central South African Railways Class 10-C, SAR Class 10C.
- Central South African Railways Class 11, SAR Class 11.
- CGR 9th Class of 1903, SAR Class Experimental 4.
- CGR 9th Class of 1906, SAR Class Experimental 5.
- CGR 10th Class, SAR Class Experimental 6.
- SAR Class ME.
- Central South African Railways Mallet Superheated, SAR Class MF.

The second letter indicates the tender's water capacity. The "_E" tenders had a capacity of between 2,800 and 2,855 imperial gallons (12,700 and 13,000 litres; 3,360 and 3,430 US gallons).

A number, when added after the letter code, indicates differences between similar tender types, such as function, wheelbase or coal bunker capacity.

== Modifications and rebuilding ==
The official SAR diagram book contains an annotation with the Type XE1 drawing to the effect that tender no. 552, a three-axle Type YC tender off a SAR Class 6C locomotive, was added to the type in 1956. While the reason is not apparent from the document, it could only have been as a result of a modification of the tender's engine drawgear which would place it in the "X_" tender group and of the tender being fitted with a larger water tank which would place it in the "_E" tender group.

=== Modifications ===
Pictures of most of these locomotives in service show them with tenders with built-up sides to the coal bunker, to increase the coal capacity. Early versions of the built-up coal bunker sides were in the form of a slatted open-top cage, made of rectangular steel rods. Later versions were constructed of sheet-metal. In the second example depicted, a Type XE1 tender with a sheet-metal extended coal bunker is plinthed with CGR 6th Class no. 356, an engine which is suited for Type "Y_", not Type "X_" tenders.

=== Rebuilding ===
From c. 1925, some Type Type XE1 tenders from Classes 6H, 6J and 8 were completely rebuilt by the SAR by mounting a new upper structure on the existing underframe. Since their new tanks increased their water capacity from 2,855 to 3,000 imperial gallons (13,000 to 13,600 litres), these tenders were reclassified to Type XF. They had a coal capacity of 10 long tons (10.2 tonnes) and a maximum axle load of 11 long tons 3 hundredweight 2 quarters (11,350 kilograms). These rebuilt tenders had a more modern appearance, with flush sides all the way to the top of the coal bunker.

The program to rebuild several older tender types with new upper structures was begun by Col F.R. Collins DSO, who approved several of the detailed drawings for the work during his term in office as Chief Mechanical Engineer of the SAR from 1922 to 1929. It was continued by his successor, A.G. Watson.

== Illustration ==
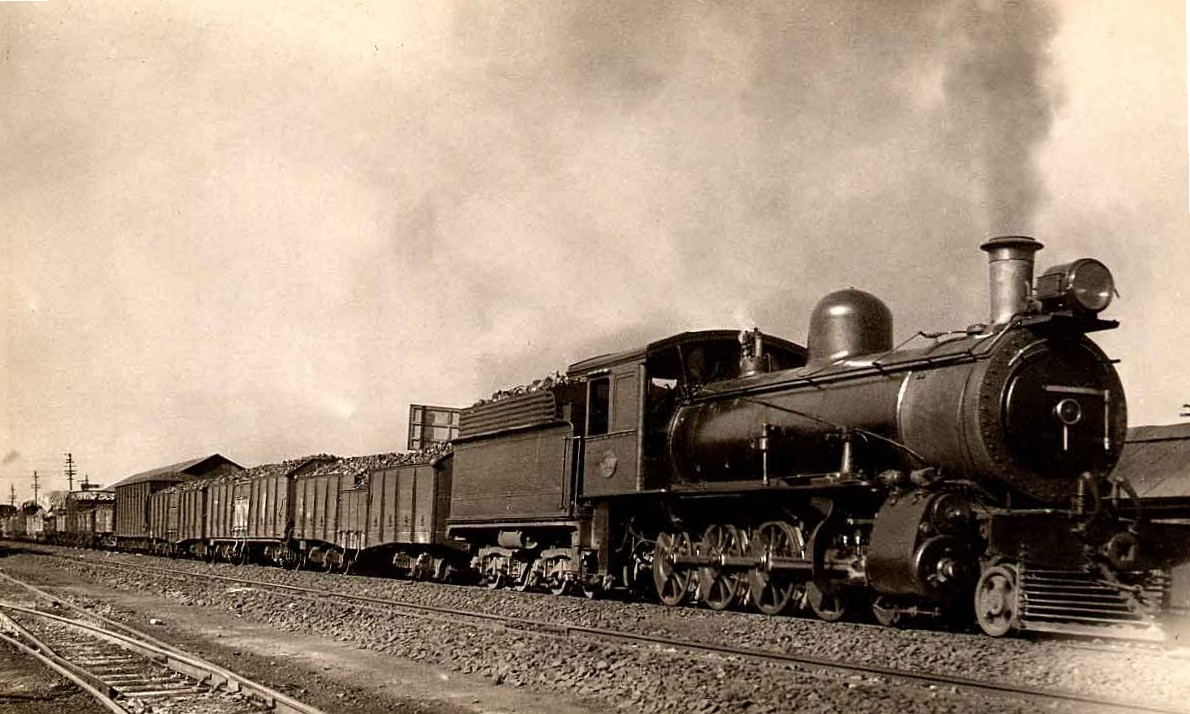
Type XE1 with slatted top on SAR Class 8, c. 1930

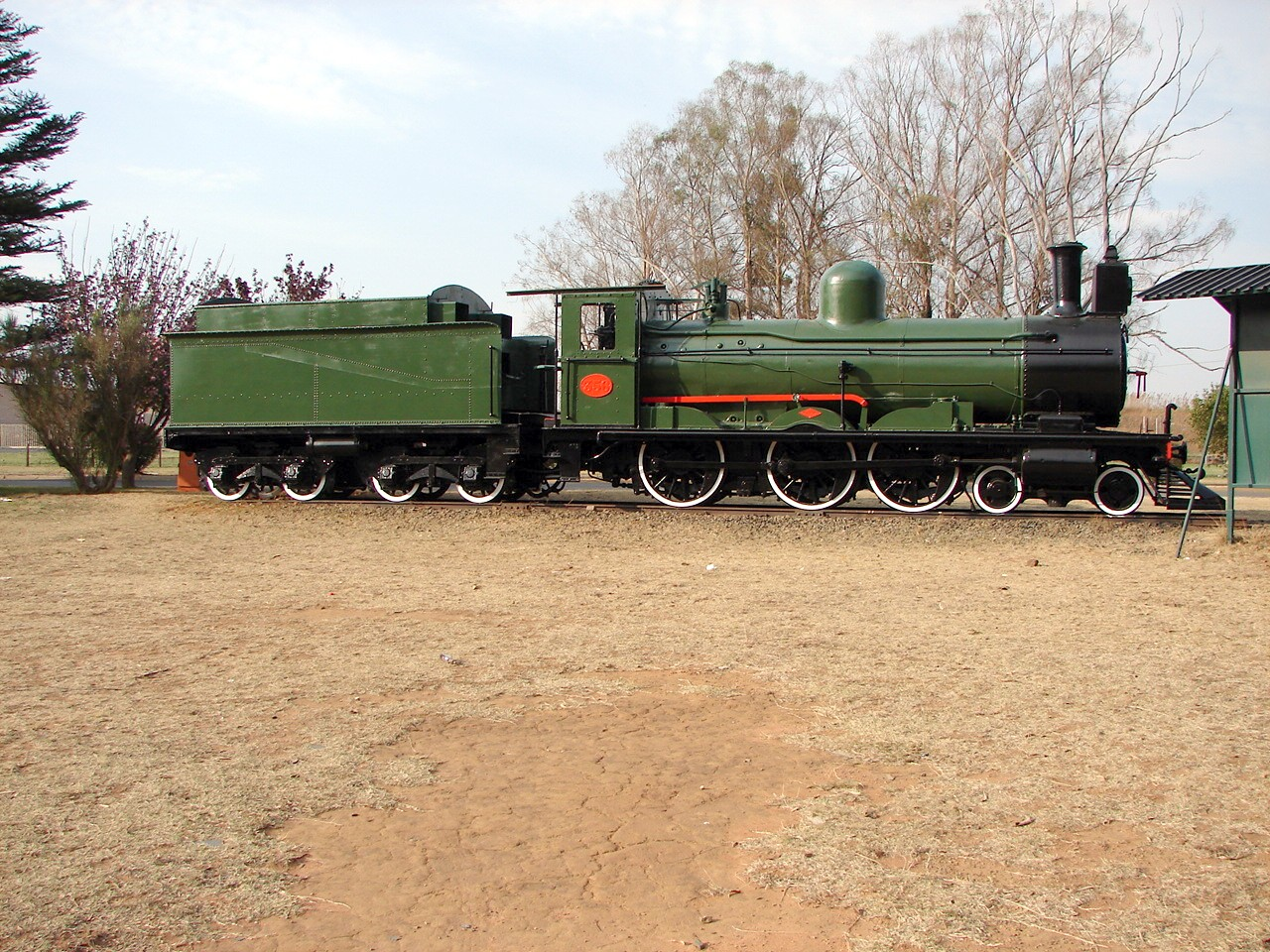
Type XE1 with sheet-metal top on SAR Class 6, 2009

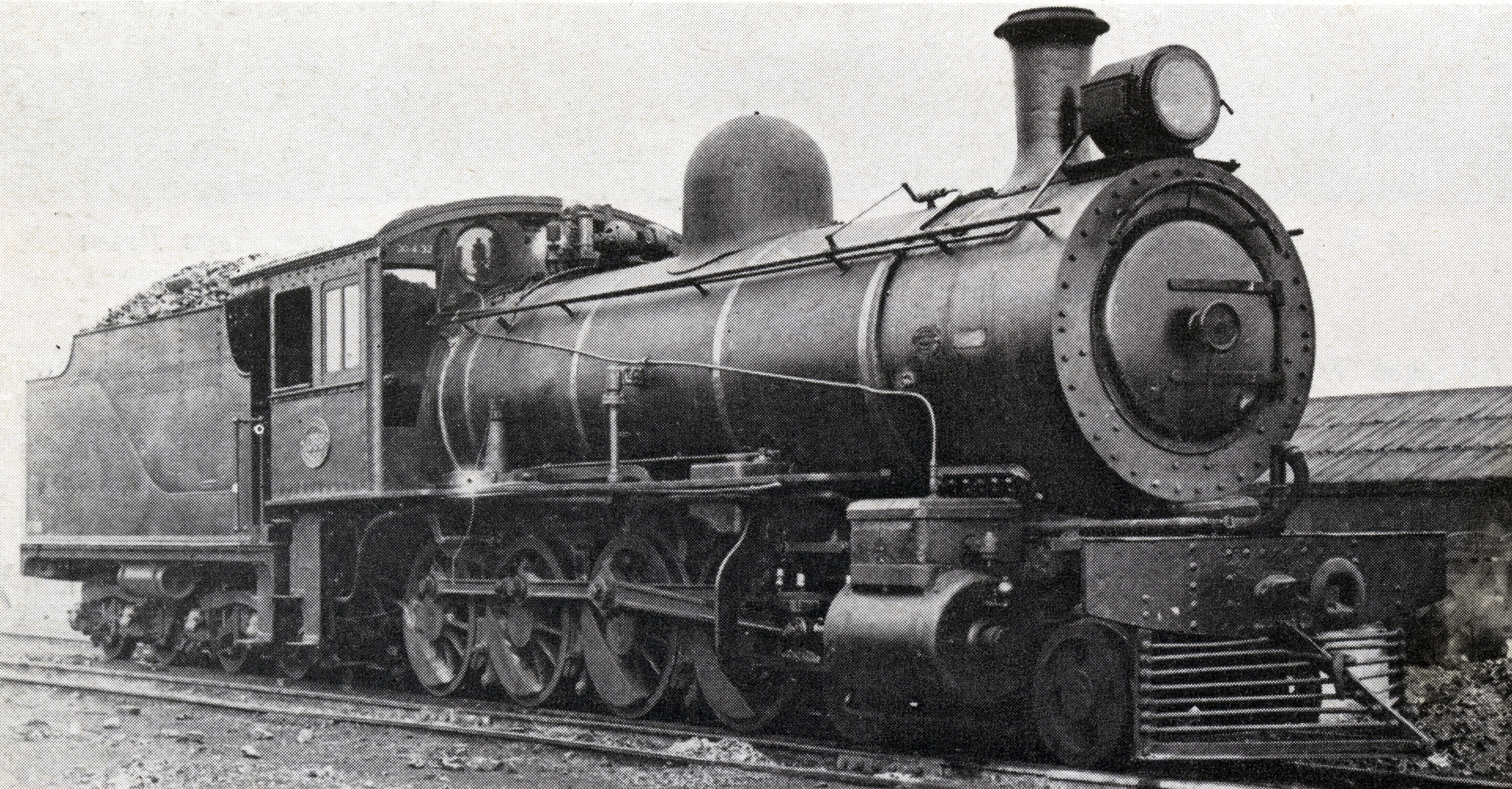
Rebuilt flush-sided Type XF tender on Class 8, c. 1930
