= South African Class 8D 4-8-0 =

1903 design of steam locomotive

CGR 8th Class 4-8-0 1903 South African Classes 8D & 8DW 4-8-0
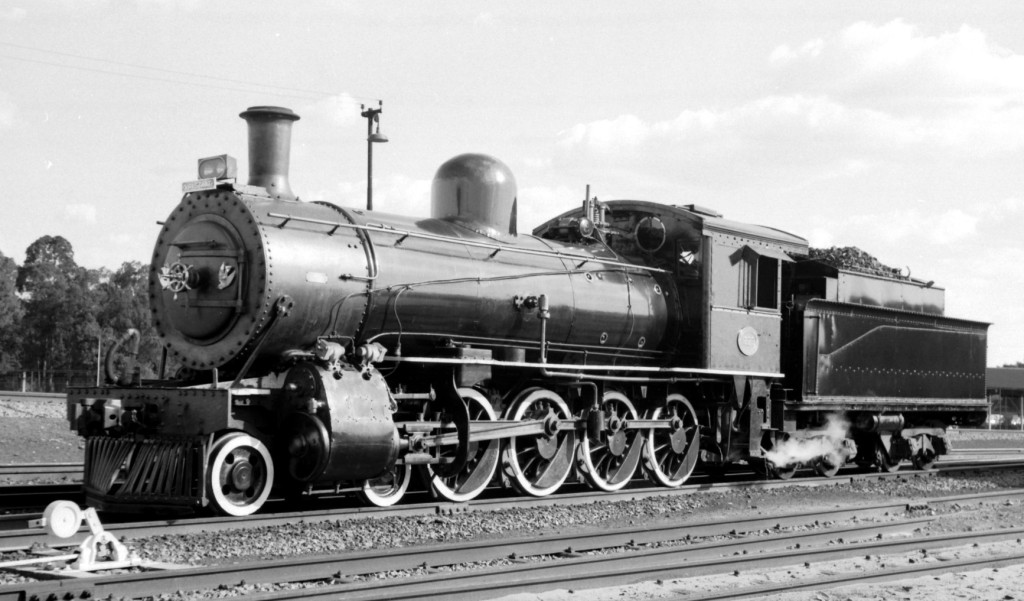
- CGR 8th Class no. 788, SAR Class 8D no. 1223, Bloemfontein, 22 March 1970
Type and origin
- ♠ Original locomotive, as built ♥ Superheated, outside admission valves ♣ Superheated, inside admission valves, Class 8DW
- Power type: Steam
- Designer: Cape Government Railways (H.M. Beatty)
- Builder: Neilson, Reid and Company; North British Locomotive Company
- Serial number: NR 6284-6301, 6303-6308, 6325-6334; NBL 15833-15836
- Model: CGR 8th Class (4-8-0)
- Build date: 1902-1903
- Total produced: 38
Specifications
- Configuration
  - Whyte: 4-8-0 (Mastodon)
  - UIC: ♠ 2'Dn2 - ♥♣ 2'Dh2
- Driver: 2nd coupled axle
- Gauge: 3 ft 6 in (1,067 mm) Cape gauge
- Leading dia.: 28 1/2 in (724 mm)
- Coupled dia.: 48 in (1,219 mm)
- Tender wheels: 33 1/2 in (851 mm) as built 34 in (864 mm) retyred
- Wheelbase: 46 ft 10 1/2 in (14,288 mm)
  - Engine: 23 ft 3 in (7,087 mm)
  - Leading: 6 ft (1,829 mm)
  - Coupled: 13 ft 6 in (4,115 mm)
  - Tender: 14 ft 7 in (4,445 mm)
  - Tender bogie: 4 ft 7 in (1,397 mm)
- Length
  - Over couplers: 54 ft 2 1/4 in (16,516 mm)
- Height: ♠ 12 ft 10 in (3,912 mm) ♥♣ 12 ft 8 in (3,861 mm)
- Frame type: Bar
- Axle load: ♠ 11 LT 14 cwt (11,890 kg) ♥ 12 LT (12,190 kg) ♣ 12 LT 11 cwt (12,750 kg)
  - Leading: ♠ 12 LT 9 cwt (12,650 kg) ♥♣ 12 LT 15 cwt (12,950 kg)
  - Coupled: ♠ 11 LT 14 cwt (11,890 kg) all ♥ 12 LT (12,190 kg) all
  - 1st coupled: ♣ 11 LT 18 cwt (12,090 kg)
  - 2nd coupled: ♣ 12 LT 11 cwt (12,750 kg)
  - 3rd coupled: ♣ 11 LT 19 cwt (12,140 kg)
  - 4th coupled: ♣ 11 LT 18 cwt (12,090 kg)
  - Tender bogie: Bogie 1: 17 LT 13 cwt (17,930 kg); Bogie 2: 18 LT 16 cwt (19,100 kg)
  - Tender axle: 9 LT 8 cwt (9,551 kg)
- Adhesive weight: ♠ 46 LT 16 cwt (47,550 kg) ♥ 48 LT (48,770 kg) ♣ 48 LT 6 cwt (49,080 kg)
- Loco weight: ♠ 59 LT 5 cwt (60,200 kg) ♥ 60 LT 15 cwt (61,720 kg) ♣ 61 LT 1 cwt (62,030 kg)
- Tender weight: 36 LT 9 cwt (37,030 kg)
- Total weight: ♠ 95 LT 14 cwt (97,240 kg) ♥ 97 LT 4 cwt (98,760 kg) ♣ 97 LT 10 cwt (99,060 kg)
- Tender type: XE1 (2-axle bogies); XC, XC1, XD, XE, XE1, XF, XF1, XF2, XJ, XM, XM1, XM2, XM3 permitted
- Fuel type: Coal
- Fuel capacity: 10 LT (10.2 t)
- Water cap.: 2,855 imp gal (13,000 L)
- Firebox
  - Type: Round-top
  - Grate area: ♠ 21.35 sq ft (1.983 m^{2}) ♥♣ 21 sq ft (2.0 m^{2})
- Boiler
  - Pitch: ♠♥♣ 7 ft 1 in (2,159 mm)
  - Diameter: ♠♥♣ 5 ft (1,524 mm)
  - Tube plates: ♠ 11 ft 1/2 in (3,366 mm) ♥♣ 11 ft 3/8 in (3,362 mm)
  - Small tubes: ♠ 205: 2 in (51 mm) ♥♣ 115: 2 in (51 mm)
  - Large tubes: ♥♣ 18: 5 1/2 in (140 mm)
- Boiler pressure: 180 psi (1,241 kPa)
- Safety valve: Ramsbottom
- Heating surface
  - Firebox: ♠ 133 sq ft (12.4 m^{2}) ♥♣ 131 sq ft (12.2 m^{2})
  - Tubes: ♠ 1,185 sq ft (110.1 m^{2}) ♥♣ 950 sq ft (88 m^{2})
  - Total surface: ♠ 1,318 sq ft (122.4 m^{2}) ♥♣ 1,081 sq ft (100.4 m^{2})
- Superheater
  - Heating area: ♥♣ 214 sq ft (19.9 m^{2})
- Cylinders: Two
- Cylinder size: ♠ 18 1/2 in (470 mm) bore ♥ 19 in (483 mm) bore ♣ 20 in (508 mm) bore ♠♥♣ 24 in (610 mm) stroke
- Valve gear: Stephenson
- Valve type: ♠ Slide - ♥♣ Piston
- Couplers: Johnston link-and-pin AAR knuckle (1930s)
Performance figures
- Tractive effort: ♠ 23,110 lbf (102.8 kN) @ 75% ♥ 24,370 lbf (108.4 kN) @ 75% ♣ 27,000 lbf (120 kN) @ 75%
Career
- Operators: Cape Government Railways; South African Railways
- Class: CGR 8th Class, SAR Classes 8D & 8DW
- Number in class: 38
- Numbers: CGR 366-384, 399, 783-794, 807-812; SAR 1192-1229
- Delivered: 1903
- First run: 1903
- Withdrawn: 1972
- The leading coupled axle had flangeless wheels

The South African Railways Class 8D 4-8-0 of 1903 was a steam locomotive from the pre-Union era in the Cape of Good Hope.

In 1903, when the first batch of 8th Class 4-8-0 Mastodon type locomotives had been tried and proven successful, the Cape Government Railways placed another 38 8th Class 4-8-0 steam locomotives in service, six on the Western System, twenty on the Midland System and twelve on the Eastern System. In 1912, when they were assimilated into the South African Railways, they were renumbered and designated Class 8D.

== Manufacture ==
=== Evolution ===
The first 8th Class locomotive of the Cape Government Railways (CGR) was a 2-8-0 Consolidation type, designed by H.M. Beatty, the Chief Locomotive Superintendent of the CGR from 1896 to 1910. It was later to be designated the South African Railways (SAR) Class 8X.

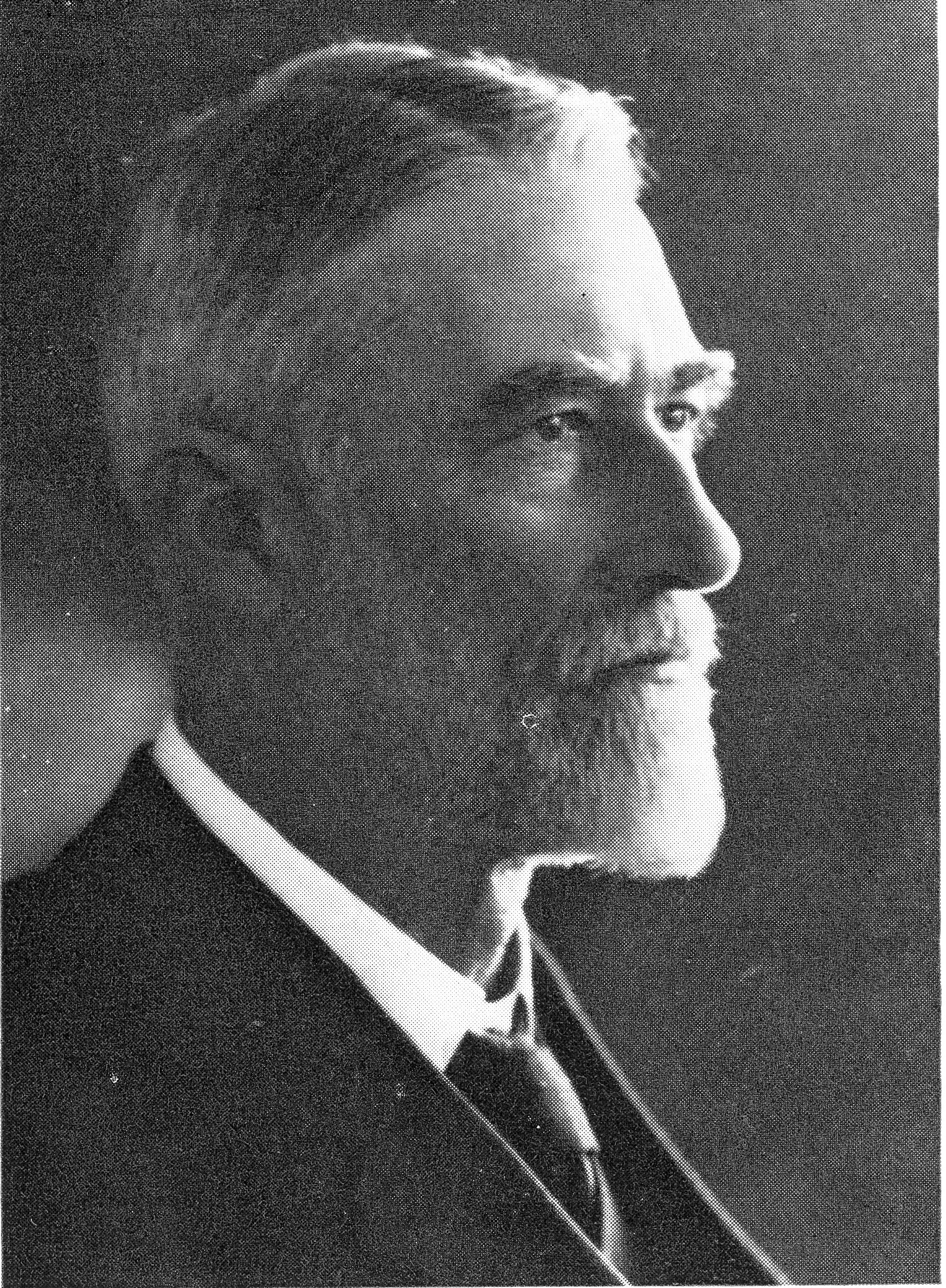
H.M. Beatty

While these first Schenectady- and ALCO-built 2-8-0 locomotives were being subjected to exhaustive testing on all types of traffic and under varying conditions, some trouble was experienced with the leading two-wheeled pony truck. When designs were prepared at Salt River for a later order for more locomotives, the pony truck was replaced with a four-wheeled bogie.

These 38 locomotives were the second batch of CGR 8th Class locomotives to be built with a 4-8-0 Mastodon type wheel arrangement. In spite of the difference in wheel arrangement, the CGR's new post-7th Class Consolidations and Mastodons were all grouped together into the 8th Class.

=== Builders ===
They were ordered from Neilson, Reid and Company in 1902 and were delivered in four batches in 1903. While they were being built, Neilson, Reid amalgamated with Dübs and Company and Sharp, Stewart and Company to form the North British Locomotive Company (NBL). As a result, the last four of these locomotives were delivered as having been built by NBL at the Hyde Park shops of the former Neilson, Reid.

The locomotives were delivered with Type XE1 tenders and distributed between the CGR's Midland, Eastern and Western systems.

- Twenty were allocated to the Midland System, nineteen of them numbered in the range from 366 to 384 and the twentieth numbered 399.
- Twelve, numbered in the range from 783 to 794, went to the Eastern System.
- Six, numbered in the range from 807 to 812, went to the Western System.

== Class 8 sub-classes ==
When the Union of South Africa was established on 31 May 1910, the three Colonial government railways (CGR, Natal Government Railways and Central South African Railways) were united under a single administration to control and administer the railways, ports and harbours of the Union. Although the South African Railways and Harbours came into existence in 1910, the actual classification and renumbering of all the rolling stock of the three constituent railways were only implemented with effect from 1 January 1912.

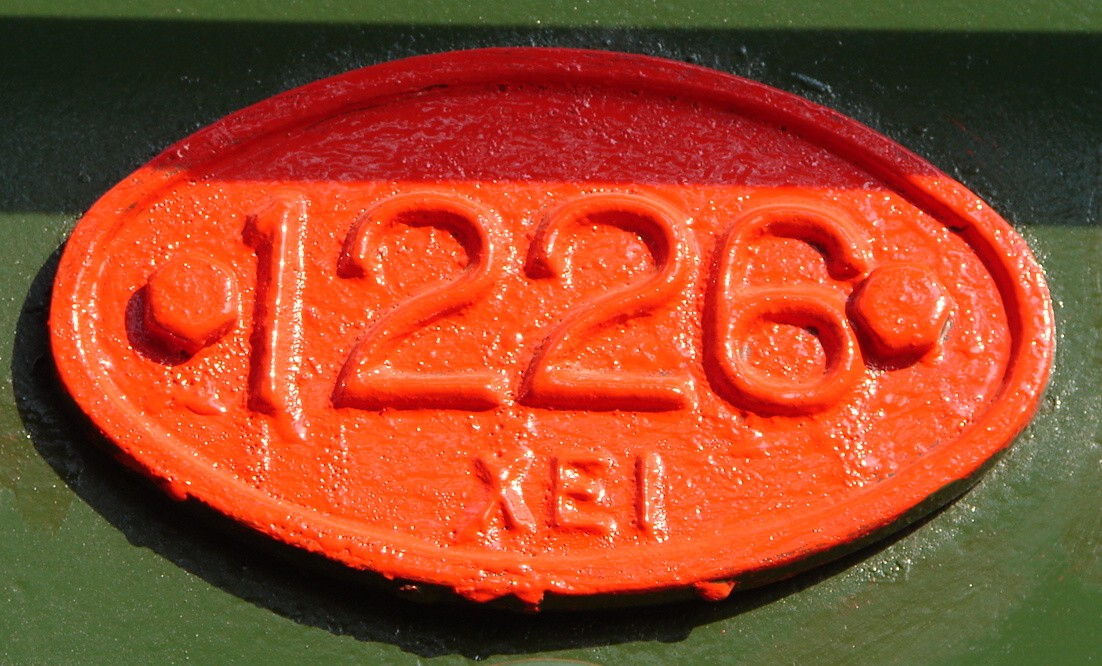

In 1912, these 38 locomotives were renumbered in the range from 1192 to 1229 and designated Class 8D on the South African Railways (SAR).

These locomotives, together with the rest of the CGR's 8th Class 2-8-0 Consolidations and 8th Class 4-8-0 Mastodons as well as the Class 8-L1 to 8-L3 4-8-0 Mastodon locomotives from the Central South African Railways (CSAR), were grouped into ten different sub-classes by the SAR. The 4-8-0 locomotives became SAR Classes 8 and 8A to 8F and the 2-8-0 locomotives became Classes 8X to 8Z.

== Modifications ==
=== Superheating ===
During A.G. Watson's term as the Chief Mechanical Engineer of the SAR from 1929 to 1936, many of the Class 8 to Class 8F locomotives were equipped with superheated boilers, larger bore cylinders and either inside or outside admission piston valves. The outside admission valve locomotives had their cylinder bore increased from 18 1/2 inches (470 millimetres) to 19 inches (483 millimetres) and retained their existing SAR classifications, while the inside admission valve locomotives had their cylinder bore increased to 20 inches (508 millimetres) and were reclassified by having a "W" suffix added to their existing SAR classifications.

Of the Class 8D locomotives, nine were equipped with superheated boilers, 19 inches (483 millimetres) bore cylinders and outside admission piston valves, while retaining their Class 8D classification.

Fourteen were equipped with superheated boilers, 20 inches (508 millimetres) bore cylinders and inside admission piston valves, and were reclassified to Class 8DW.

=== Experimental chimney ===
In the early 1930s engine no. 1197 was fitted with an experimental chimney designed by Watson. A similar chimney, the shape of which earned it a nickname that referred to a night bucket, was also tested on Class 5B no. 726. This experiment did not result in further production.

== Service ==
In SAR service, the 4-8-0 Class 8 family of locomotives served on every system in the country and, in the 1920s, became the mainstay of motive power on many branch lines. Their final days were spent in shunting service and they were all withdrawn by 1972.

Some were sold into industrial service after withdrawal, like no. 1211, which became Puffing Duggie at Grootvlei Proprietary Mines (GVPM).

== Works numbers ==
The Class 8D and Class 8DW locomotive builders, works numbers, CGR to SAR renumbering and superheating modifications are listed in the table.

Class 8D 4-8-0 Builders, Works Numbers & Renumbering
| Builder | Year | Works No. | CGR No. | CGR System | SAR No. | SAR Model |
|---|---|---|---|---|---|---|
| Neilson Reid | 1903 | 6325 | 807 | Western | 1192 | Class 8DW |
| Neilson Reid | 1903 | 6326 | 808 | Western | 1193 | |
| Neilson Reid | 1903 | 6327 | 809 | Western | 1194 | |
| Neilson Reid | 1903 | 6328 | 810 | Western | 1195 | |
| Neilson Reid | 1903 | 6329 | 811 | Western | 1196 | Superheated |
| Neilson Reid | 1903 | 6330 | 812 | Western | 1197 | Class 8DW |
| Neilson Reid | 1902 | 6284 | 366 | Midland | 1198 | Class 8DW |
| Neilson Reid | 1902 | 6285 | 367 | Midland | 1199 | |
| Neilson Reid | 1902 | 6286 | 368 | Midland | 1200 | Superheated |
| Neilson Reid | 1902 | 6287 | 369 | Midland | 1201 | |
| Neilson Reid | 1902 | 6288 | 370 | Midland | 1202 | Class 8DW |
| Neilson Reid | 1902 | 6289 | 371 | Midland | 1203 | |
| Neilson Reid | 1902 | 6290 | 372 | Midland | 1204 | |
| Neilson Reid | 1902 | 6291 | 373 | Midland | 1205 | Class 8DW |
| Neilson Reid | 1902 | 6292 | 374 | Midland | 1206 | Class 8DW |
| Neilson Reid | 1902 | 6293 | 375 | Midland | 1207 | Class 8DW |
| Neilson Reid | 1902 | 6294 | 376 | Midland | 1208 | Class 8DW |
| Neilson Reid | 1902 | 6295 | 377 | Midland | 1209 | |
| Neilson Reid | 1903 | 6303 | 378 | Midland | 1210 | |
| Neilson Reid | 1903 | 6304 | 379 | Midland | 1211 | Class 8DW |
| Neilson Reid | 1903 | 6305 | 380 | Midland | 1212 | Class 8DW |
| Neilson Reid | 1903 | 6308 | 381 | Midland | 1213 | Superheated |
| NBL | 1903 | 15833 | 382 | Midland | 1214 | Superheated |
| NBL | 1903 | 15834 | 383 | Midland | 1215 | |
| NBL | 1903 | 15835 | 384 | Midland | 1216 | Class 8DW |
| NBL | 1903 | 15836 | 399 | Midland | 1217 | Superheated |
| Neilson Reid | 1902 | 6296 | 783 | Eastern | 1218 | |
| Neilson Reid | 1902 | 6297 | 784 | Eastern | 1219 | Class 8DW |
| Neilson Reid | 1902 | 6298 | 785 | Eastern | 1220 | |
| Neilson Reid | 1902 | 6299 | 786 | Eastern | 1221 | Class 8DW |
| Neilson Reid | 1903 | 6306 | 787 | Eastern | 1222 | |
| Neilson Reid | 1902 | 6300 | 788 | Eastern | 1223 | Superheated |
| Neilson Reid | 1903 | 6307 | 789 | Eastern | 1224 | Superheated |
| Neilson Reid | 1902 | 6301 | 790 | Eastern | 1225 | Superheated |
| Neilson Reid | 1903 | 6331 | 791 | Eastern | 1226 | Class 8DW |
| Neilson Reid | 1903 | 6332 | 792 | Eastern | 1227 | |
| Neilson Reid | 1903 | 6333 | 793 | Eastern | 1228 | |
| Neilson Reid | 1903 | 6334 | 794 | Eastern | 1229 | Superheated |

== Illustration ==
The main picture shows reboilered and modified SAR Class 8D no. 1223 at the Bloemfontein locomotive depot on 22 March 1970. In the second picture below, the same locomotive is depicted before the modification.

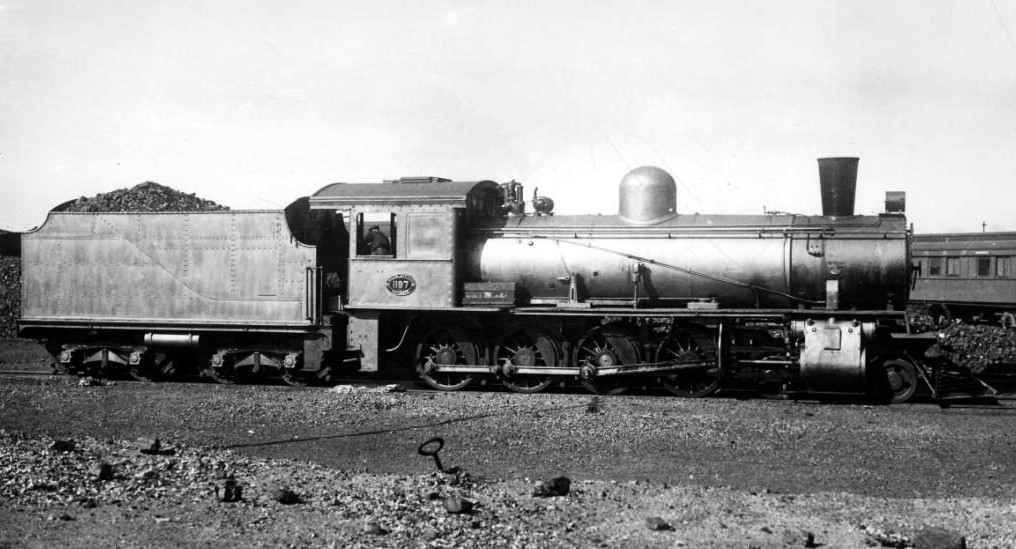
No. 1197 at East London with an experimental night bucket chimney, c. 1931

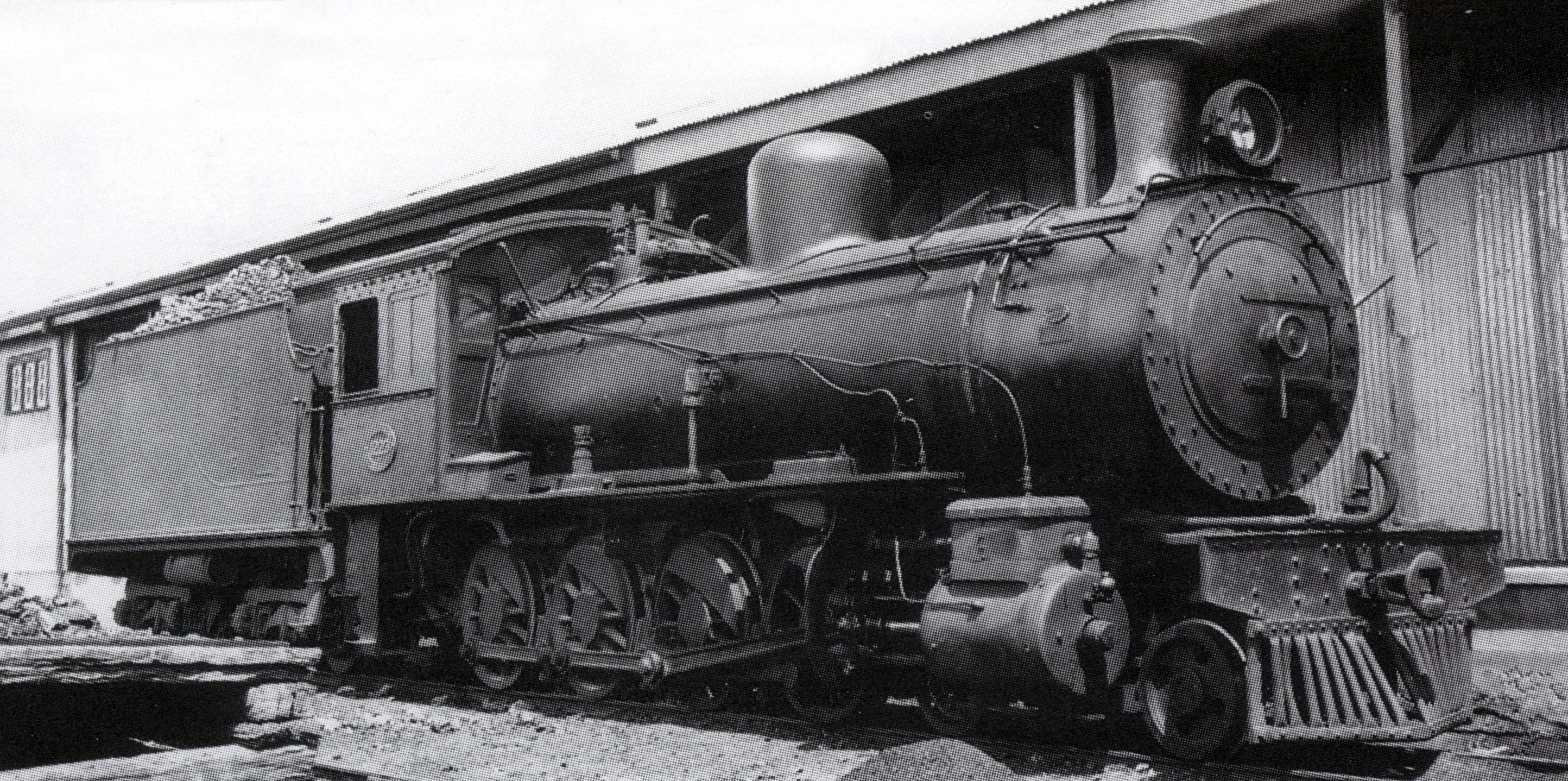
Still unmodified ex CGR (Eastern System) no. 788, SAR no. 1223, at Fort Beaufort, Eastern Cape, c. 1936

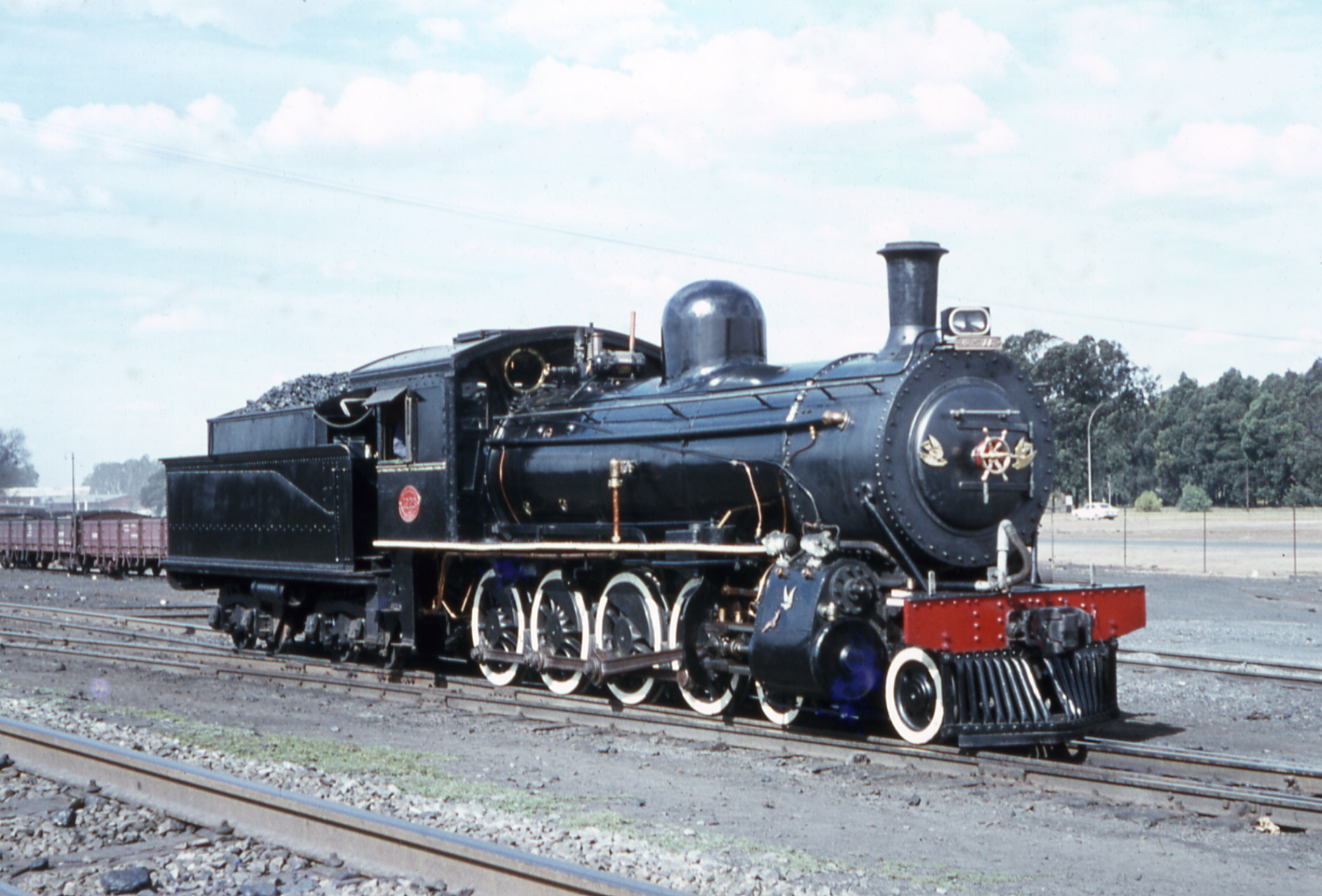
Ex CGR (Eastern System) no. 788, SAR no. 1223, here modified to superheating, c. 1970

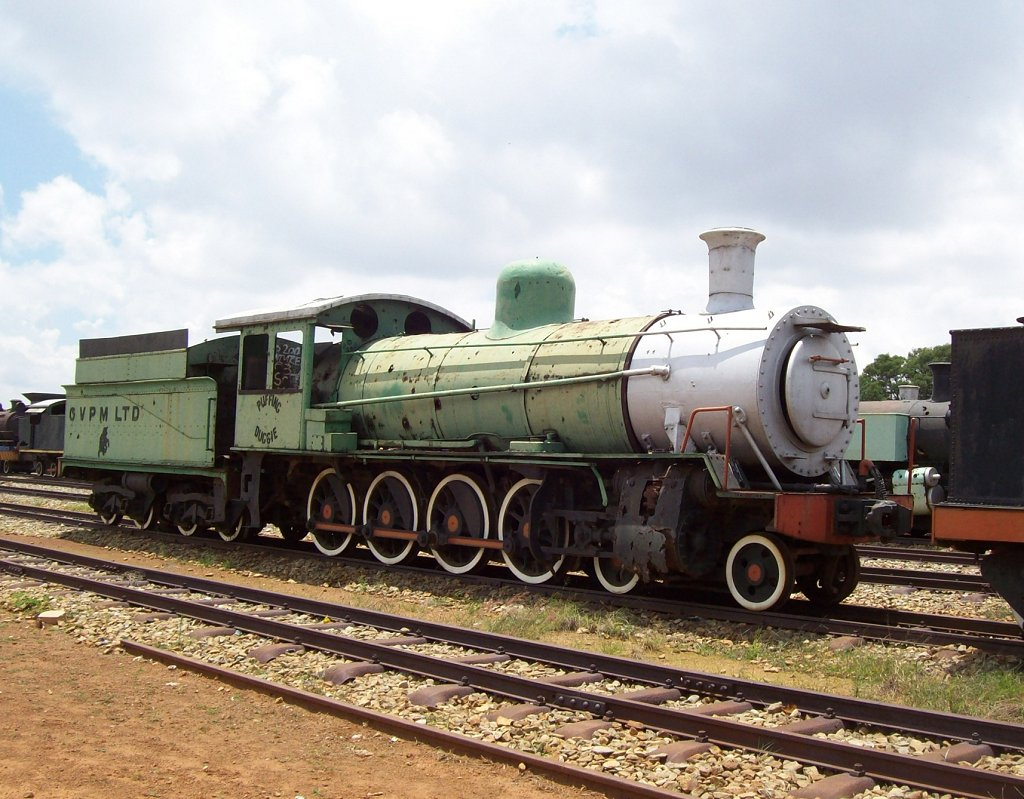
Ex SAR Class 8DW no. 1211, GVPM Puffing Duggie, Chamdor, 2 February 2009
