= South African Class Experimental 5 2-8-2 =

1906 design of steam locomotive

CGR 9th Class 2-8-2 1906 South African Class Experimental 5 2-8-2
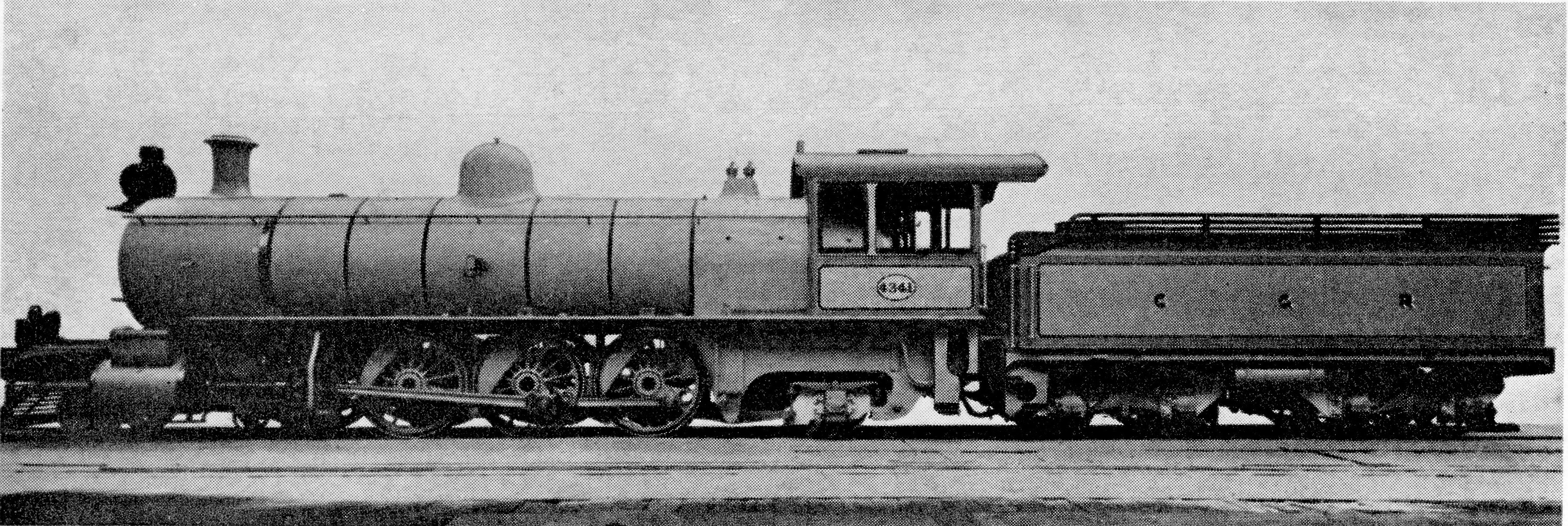
- CGR 9th Class no. 840, c. 1906
Type and origin
- Power type: Steam
- Designer: Cape Government Railways (H.M. Beatty)
- Builder: Kitson and Company
- Serial number: 4341
- Model: CGR 9th Class
- Build date: 1906
- Total produced: 1
Specifications
- Configuration
  - Whyte: 2-8-2 (Mikado)
  - UIC: 1'D1'n2
- Driver: 3rd coupled axle
- Gauge: 3 ft 6 in (1,067 mm) Cape gauge
- Leading dia.: 28 1/2 in (724 mm)
- Coupled dia.: 54 in (1,372 mm)
- Trailing dia.: 33 in (838 mm)
- Tender wheels: 33 1/2 in (851 mm) as built 34 in (864 mm) retyred
- Wheelbase: 55 ft 1 1/4 in (16,796 mm)
  - Axle spacing (Asymmetrical): 1-2: 5 ft 1 in (1,549 mm); 2-3: 4 ft 8 in (1,422 mm); 3-4: 4 ft 10 in (1,473 mm)
  - Engine: 29 ft 9 in (9,068 mm)
  - Coupled: 14 ft 7 in (4,445 mm)
  - Tender: 16 ft 1 in (4,902 mm)
  - Tender bogie: 4 ft 7 in (1,397 mm)
- Length
  - Over couplers: 63 ft 3/8 in (19,212 mm)
- Height: 12 ft 10 in (3,912 mm)
- Frame type: Bar
- Axle load: 14 LT 3 cwt (14,380 kg)
  - Leading: 6 LT 10 cwt 2 qtr (6,630 kg)
  - 1st coupled: 14 LT 3 cwt (14,380 kg)
  - 2nd coupled: 13 LT 2 cwt (13,310 kg)
  - 3rd coupled: 13 LT 13 cwt (13,870 kg)
  - 4th coupled: 13 LT 17 cwt (14,070 kg)
  - Trailing: 11 LT 1 cwt (11,230 kg)
  - Tender bogie: Bogie 1: 19 LT 2 cwt (19,410 kg); Bogie 2: 20 LT 12 cwt (20,930 kg)
  - Tender axle: 9 LT 11 cwt (9,703 kg)
- Adhesive weight: 54 LT 15 cwt (55,630 kg)
- Loco weight: 72 LT 6 cwt 2 qtr (73,490 kg)
- Tender weight: 39 LT 14 cwt (40,340 kg)
- Total weight: 112 LT 0 cwt 2 qtr (113,800 kg)
- Tender type: XF2 (2-axle bogies)
- Fuel type: Coal
- Fuel capacity: 7 LT 10 cwt (7.6 t)
- Water cap.: 3,000 imp gal (13,600 L)
- Firebox
  - Type: Round-top
  - Grate area: 33.1 sq ft (3.08 m^{2})
- Boiler
  - Pitch: 7 ft 3 in (2,210 mm)
  - Diameter: 5 ft 6 3/8 in (1,686 mm)
  - Tube plates: 17 ft (5,182 mm)
  - Small tubes: 203: 2 1/4 in (57 mm)
- Boiler pressure: 180 psi (1,241 kPa)
- Safety valve: Ramsbottom
- Heating surface
  - Firebox: 129.7 sq ft (12.05 m^{2})
  - Tubes: 2,032.8 sq ft (188.85 m^{2})
  - Total surface: 2,162.5 sq ft (200.90 m^{2})
- Cylinders: Two
- Cylinder size: 20 in (508 mm) bore 28 in (711 mm) stroke
- Valve gear: Stephenson
- Couplers: Johnston link-and-pin
Performance figures
- Tractive effort: 28,000 lbf (120 kN) @ 75%
Career
- Operators: Cape Government Railways; South African Railways
- Class: CGR 9th Class Mikado; SAR Class Experimental 5
- Number in class: 1
- Numbers: CGR 840, SAR 948
- Delivered: 1906
- First run: 1906
- Withdrawn: 1929
- The 2nd & 3rd coupled axles had flangeless wheels

The South African Railways Class Experimental 5 2-8-2 of 1906 was a steam locomotive from the pre-Union era in the Cape of Good Hope.

In 1906, the Cape Government Railways placed a single experimental 9th Class steam locomotive with a 2-8-2 Mikado type wheel arrangement in service. In 1912, when this locomotive was assimilated into the South African Railways, it was renumbered and designated Class Experimental 5. The design was never repeated.

== Manufacturer ==
The Cape 9th Class Mikado type steam locomotive was designed by H.M. Beatty, the Locomotive Superintendent of the Cape Government Railways (CGR) from 1896 to 1910. It was a larger version of his 9th Class of 1903, which was also built with a bar frame and Stephenson's Link valve gear and which also used saturated steam. The locomotive was delivered with a Type XF2 tender by Kitson and Company in 1906 and was numbered 840.

== Characteristics ==
At the time, the locomotive was considered as a big advance in motive power. It was a large engine and on the CGR it was exceeded in size only by the experimental Kitson-Meyer 0-6-0+0-6-0 locomotive which had entered service in 1903.

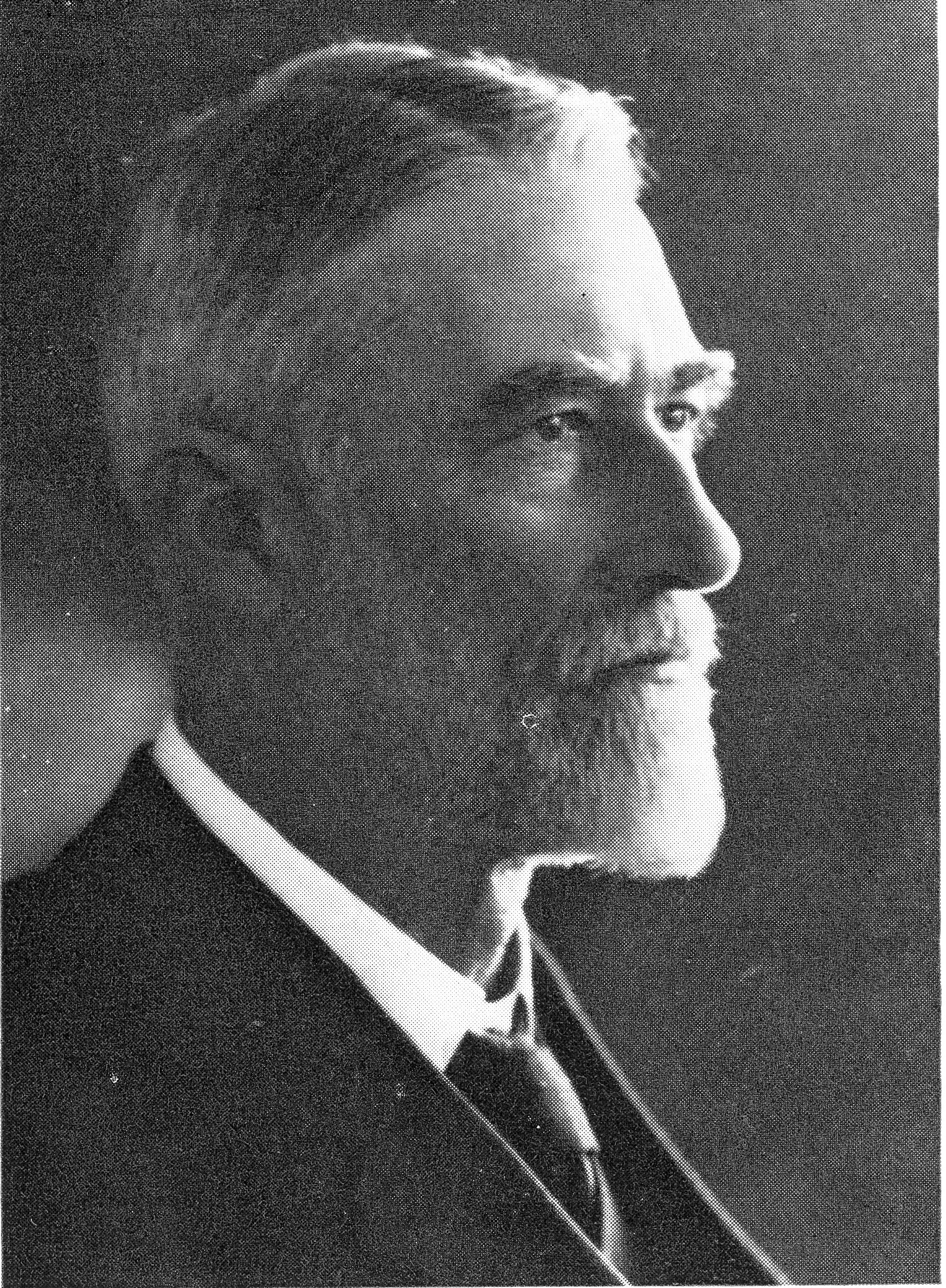
H.M. Beatty

With this locomotive, Beatty overcame his aversion to boiler centre lines which exceeded twice the Cape gauge width of 3 feet 6 inches (1,067 millimetres) above the railhead, by raising the boiler pitch to 7 feet 3 inches (2,210 millimetres). The locomotive was larger than its predecessor 9th Class of 1903 in all respects, with a longer boiler which had a bigger girth, larger diameter pistons with a longer stroke, larger diameter driving wheels, a larger firebox, and a tender with a larger fuel and water capacity. The design was, however, never repeated and the Cape 9th Class Mikado remained unique.

== Service ==
=== Cape Government Railways ===
The locomotive was placed in service on the Western System, working on the mainline between Touws River and Prince Albert Road in the Karoo. When it was determined by the Civil Department of the CGR that the engine was too heavy for the rails and bridges on this section, it was transferred to the section between Beaufort West and De Aar where heavier rail was in use.

=== South African Railways ===
When the Union of South Africa was established on 31 May 1910, the three Colonial government railways (CGR, Natal Government Railways and Central South African Railways) were united under a single administration to control and administer the railways, ports and harbours of the Union. Although the South African Railways and Harbours came into existence in 1910, the actual classification and renumbering of all the rolling stock of the three constituent railways were only implemented with effect from 1 January 1912.

In 1912, the locomotive was designated Class Experimental 5 and renumbered to 948 on the South African Railways. It was later transferred to Braamfontein, where it remained until it was withdrawn from service and scrapped in 1929.
