= South African Class 8Z 2-8-0 =

1904 design of steam locomotive

CGR 8th Class 2-8-0 1904 South African Class 8Z 2-8-0
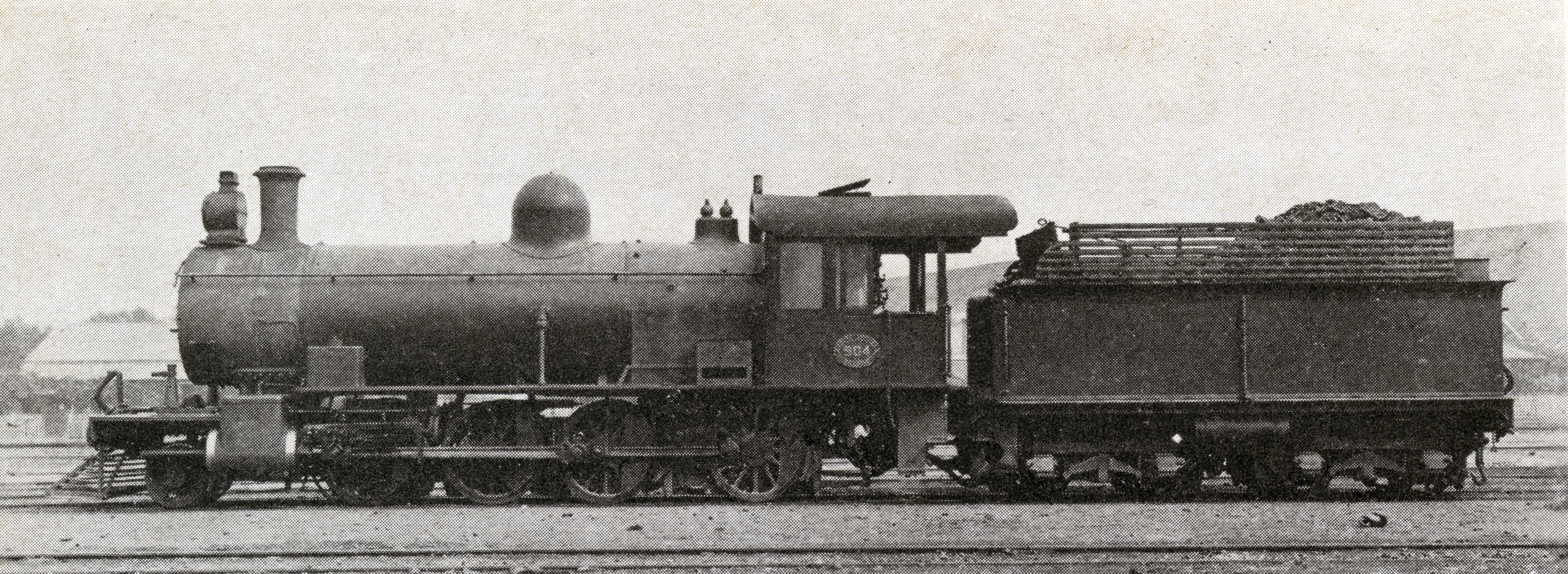
- CGR 8th Class no. 825, SAR Class 8Z no. 904
Type and origin
- Power type: Steam
- Designer: Cape Government Railways (H.M. Beatty)
- Builder: North British Locomotive Company
- Serial number: 16095-16102
- Model: CGR 8th Class (2-8-0)
- Build date: 1904
- Total produced: 8
Specifications
- Configuration
  - Whyte: 2-8-0 (Consolidation)
  - UIC: 1'Dn2
- Driver: 3rd coupled axle
- Gauge: 3 ft 6 in (1,067 mm) Cape gauge
- Leading dia.: 28 1/2 in (724 mm)
- Coupled dia.: 48 in (1,219 mm)
- Tender wheels: 33 1/2 in (851 mm) as built 34 in (864 mm) retyred
- Wheelbase: 47 ft (14,326 mm)
  - Axle spacing (Asymmetrical): 1-2: 4 ft 7 in (1,397 mm); 2-3: 4 ft 3 in (1,295 mm); 3-4: 5 ft 8 in (1,727 mm)
  - Engine: 21 ft 8 in (6,604 mm)
  - Coupled: 14 ft 6 in (4,420 mm)
  - Tender: 14 ft 7 in (4,445 mm)
  - Tender bogie: 4 ft 7 in (1,397 mm)
- Length
  - Over couplers: 54 ft 9 1/2 in (16,700 mm)
- Height: 12 ft 10 in (3,912 mm)
- Frame type: Bar
- Axle load: 13 LT (13,210 kg)
  - Leading: 5 LT (5,080 kg)
  - 1st coupled: 12 LT 11 cwt (12,750 kg)
  - 2nd coupled: 12 LT 17 cwt (13,060 kg)
  - 3rd coupled: 13 LT (13,210 kg)
  - 4th coupled: 13 LT (13,210 kg)
  - Tender bogie: Bogie 1: 17 LT 13 cwt (17,930 kg); Bogie 2: 18 LT 16 cwt (19,100 kg)
  - Tender axle: 9 LT 8 cwt (9,551 kg)
- Adhesive weight: 51 LT 8 cwt (52,220 kg)
- Loco weight: 56 LT 8 cwt (57,310 kg)
- Tender weight: 36 LT 9 cwt (37,030 kg)
- Total weight: 92 LT 17 cwt (94,340 kg)
- Tender type: XE1 (2-axle bogies)
- Fuel type: Coal
- Fuel capacity: 10 LT (10.2 t)
- Water cap.: 2,855 imp gal (13,000 L)
- Firebox
  - Type: Round-top
  - Grate area: 32 sq ft (3.0 m^{2})
- Boiler
  - Pitch: 7 ft 3 in (2,210 mm)
  - Diameter: 4 ft 11 in (1,499 mm)
  - Tube plates: 12 ft 5 11/16 in (3,802 mm)
  - Small tubes: 194: 2 in (51 mm)
- Boiler pressure: 180 psi (1,241 kPa)
- Safety valve: Ramsbottom
- Heating surface
  - Firebox: 106 sq ft (9.8 m^{2})
  - Tubes: 1,355 sq ft (125.9 m^{2})
  - Total surface: 1,461 sq ft (135.7 m^{2})
- Cylinders: Two
- Cylinder size: 18 1/2 in (470 mm) bore 24 in (610 mm) stroke
- Valve gear: Stephenson
- Valve type: Slide
- Couplers: Johnston link-and-pin
Performance figures
- Tractive effort: 23,110 lbf (102.8 kN) @ 75%
Career
- Operators: Cape Government Railways; South African Railways
- Class: CGR 8th Class (2-8-0); SAR Class 8Z
- Number in class: 8
- Numbers: CGR 821-828, SAR 900-907
- Delivered: 1904
- First run: 1904
- Withdrawn: 1935
- The 2nd & 3rd coupled axles had flangeless wheels

The South African Railways Class 8Z 2-8-0 of 1904 was a steam locomotive from the pre-Union era in the Cape of Good Hope.

In 1904, the Cape Government Railways placed its last eight 8th Class 2-8-0 Consolidation type steam locomotives in service. Most of its other 8th Class locomotives were built with a 4-8-0 Mastodon type wheel arrangement. In 1912, when they were assimilated into the South African Railways, these eight were renumbered and designated Class 8Z.

== Manufacturer ==
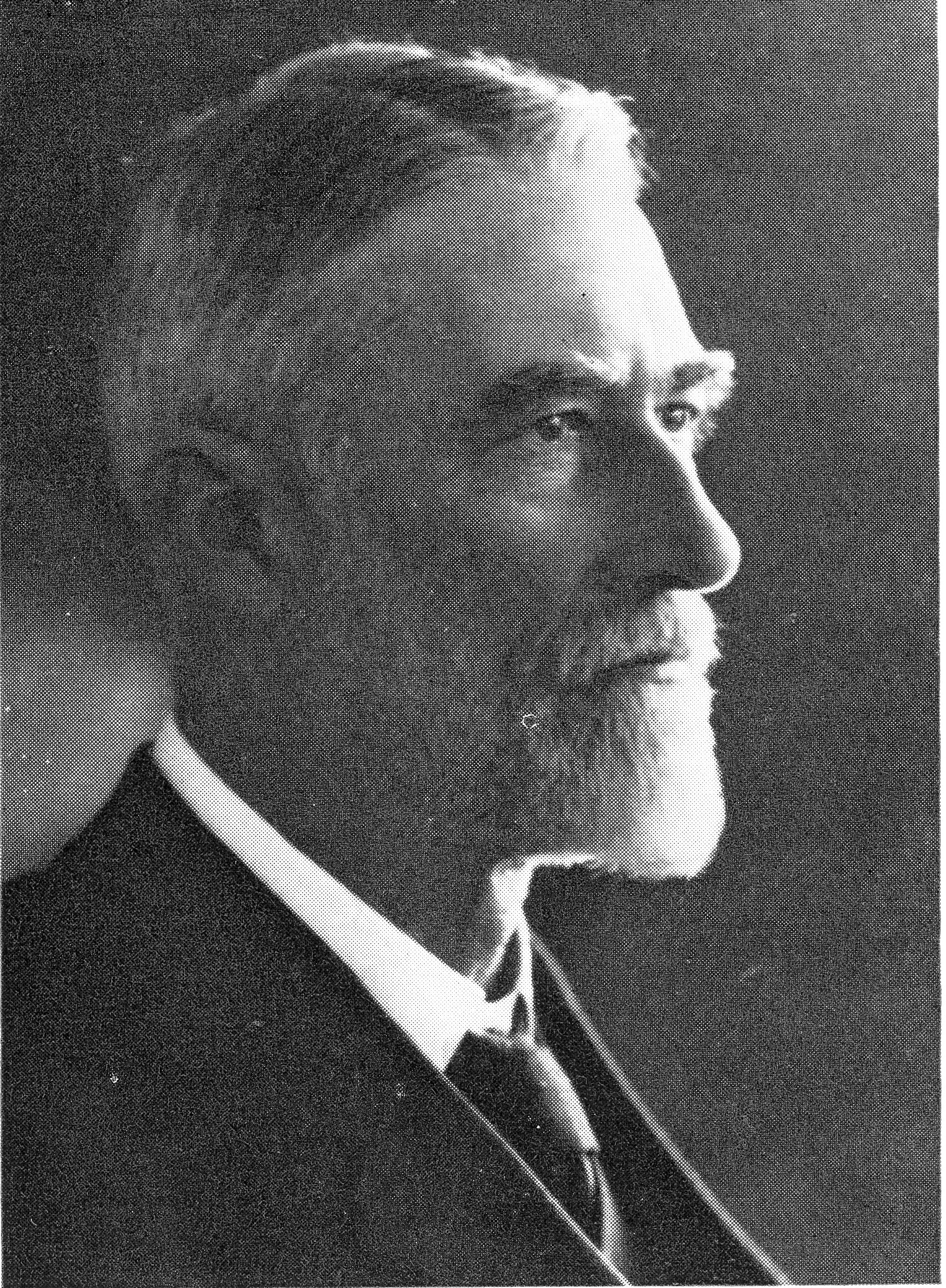
H.M. Beatty

The first locomotive in the Cape Government Railways (CGR) 2-8-0 Consolidation type 8th Class, later to become the South African Railways (SAR) Class 8X, was designed by H.M. Beatty, the CGR's Chief Locomotive Superintendent from 1896 to 1910.

In 1904, a third batch of eight of these locomotives was delivered from the North British Locomotive Company of Glasgow, Scotland. All eight were allocated to the Western System of the CGR, numbered in the range from 821 to 828.

== Characteristics ==
These locomotives were very similar to the previous four Kitson-built Consolidations, but slightly larger in boiler and firegrate area dimensions. They also used saturated steam and cylinders with overhead slide valves, actuated by inside Stephenson valve gear. Of the three models of Type XE1 tender which were in use at the time, these locomotives were equipped with the version which had the 10 long tons (10.2 tonnes) coal capacity.

== Class 8 sub-classes ==
When the Union of South Africa was established on 31 May 1910, the three Colonial government railways (CGR, Natal Government Railways and Central South African Railways) were united under a single administration to control and administer the railways, ports and harbours of the Union. Even though the South African Railways and Harbours came into existence in 1910, the actual classification and renumbering of all the rolling stock of the three constituent railways were only implemented with effect from 1 January 1912.

In 1912, these locomotives were designated Class 8Z on the South African Railways (SAR) and renumbered in the range from 900 to 907.

In spite of the difference in wheel arrangement, the CGR grouped its 2-8-0 Consolidation and post-7th Class 4-8-0 Mastodon locomotives together as the 8th Class. In 1912, all these 2-8-0 and 4-8-0 locomotives, together with the Classes 8-L1 to 8-L3 4-8-0 Mastodon locomotives from the Central South African Railways (CSAR), were grouped into ten different sub-classes by the SAR. The 4-8-0 locomotives became SAR Classes 8 and 8A to 8F and the 2-8-0 locomotives became Classes 8X to 8Z.

== Service ==
In SAR service, the Class 8Z was used mainly in the Western Cape, shedded at Touws River. A few later ended up at Bloemfontein in the Orange Free State and Klerksdorp in Transvaal. They were withdrawn by 1935.

== Illustration ==
The main picture shows no. 804 at Touws River, c. 1930.

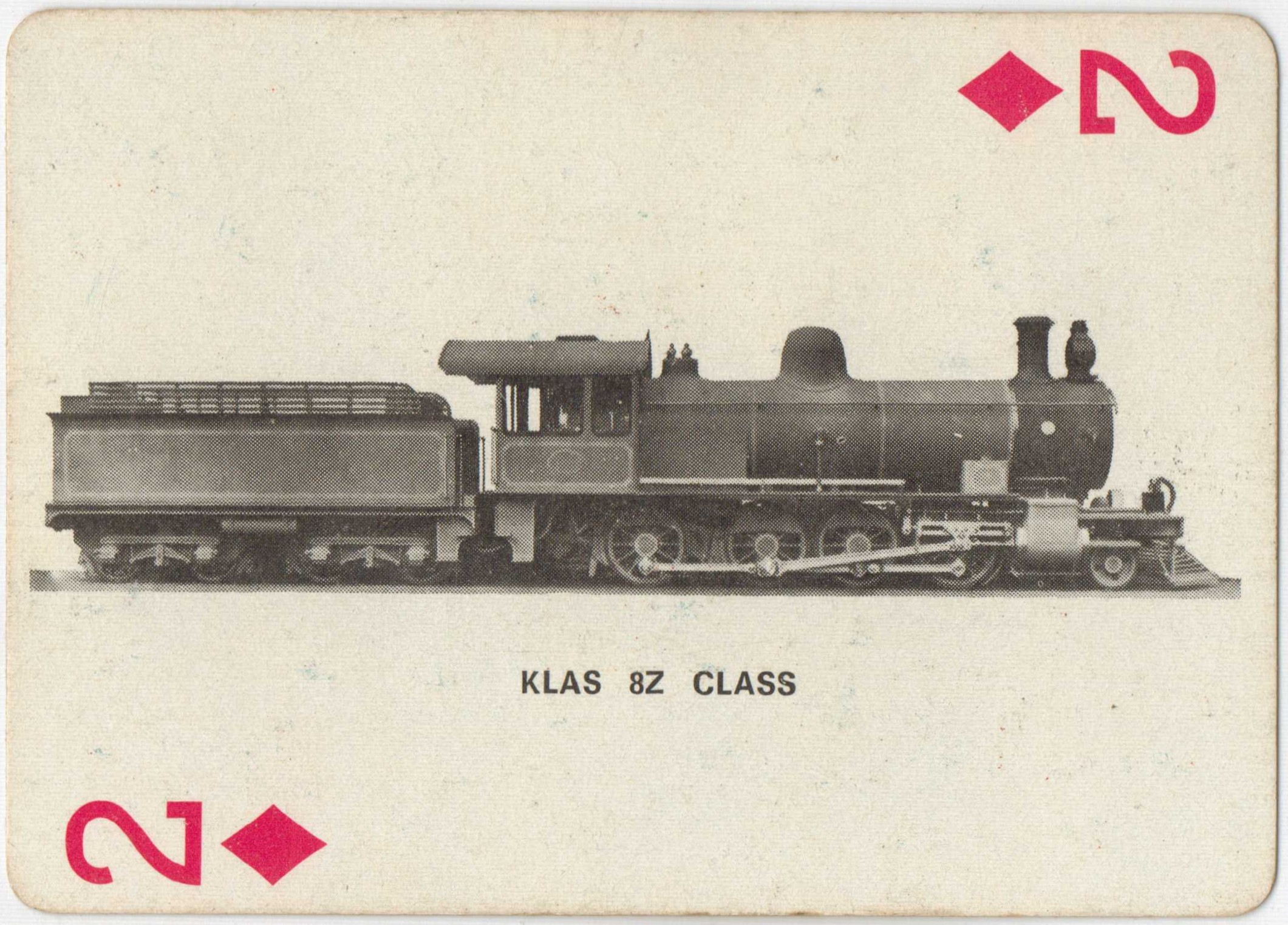
Class 8Z as depicted on a SAR museum playing card
