= South African Class Experimental 4 2-8-2 =

1903 design of steam locomotive

CGR 9th Class 2-8-2 1903 South African Class Experimental 4 2-8-2
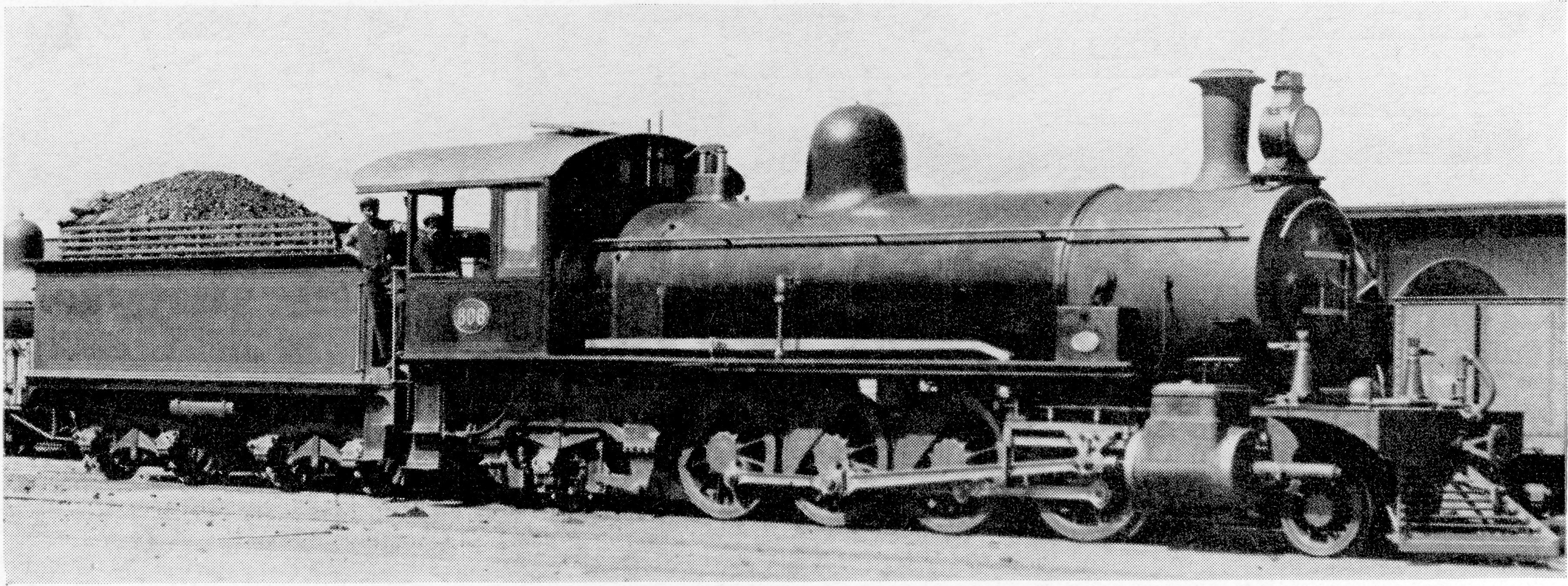
- CGR 9th Class no. 806, c. 1911; SAR Class Experimental 4 no. 911
Type and origin
- Power type: Steam
- Designer: Cape Government Railways (H.M. Beatty)
- Builder: Kitson and Company
- Serial number: 4195-4196
- Model: CGR 9th Class
- Build date: 1903
- Total produced: 2
Specifications
- Configuration
  - Whyte: 2-8-2 (Mikado)
  - UIC: 1'D1'n2
- Driver: 3rd coupled axle
- Gauge: 3 ft 6 in (1,067 mm) Cape gauge
- Leading dia.: 28 1/2 in (724 mm)
- Coupled dia.: 48 in (1,219 mm)
- Trailing dia.: 33 in (838 mm)
- Tender wheels: 33 1/2 in (851 mm) as built 34 in (864 mm) retyred
- Wheelbase: 50 ft 7 1/4 in (15,424 mm)
  - Axle spacing (Asymmetrical): 1-2: 4 ft 7 in (1,397 mm); 2-3: 4 ft 3 in (1,295 mm); 3-4: 4 ft 3 in (1,295 mm)
  - Engine: 26 ft 9 in (8,153 mm)
  - Coupled: 13 ft 1 in (3,988 mm)
  - Tender: 14 ft 7 in (4,445 mm)
  - Tender bogie: 4 ft 7 in (1,397 mm)
- Length
  - Over couplers: 58 ft 5 3/4 in (17,824 mm)
- Height: 12 ft 10 in (3,912 mm)
- Frame type: Bar
- Axle load: 12 LT 16 cwt (13,010 kg)
  - Leading: 5 LT 5 cwt (5,334 kg)
  - 1st coupled: 12 LT 6 cwt (12,500 kg)
  - 2nd coupled: 11 LT 16 cwt (11,990 kg)
  - 3rd coupled: 12 LT (12,190 kg)
  - 4th coupled: 12 LT 16 cwt (13,010 kg)
  - Trailing: 10 LT 4 cwt (10,360 kg)
  - Tender axle: 9 LT 4 cwt 1 qtr (9,360 kg) av.
- Adhesive weight: 48 LT 18 cwt (49,680 kg)
- Loco weight: 64 LT 7 cwt (65,380 kg)
- Tender weight: 36 LT 18 cwt (37,490 kg)
- Total weight: 101 LT 5 cwt (102,900 kg)
- Tender type: XE1 (2-axle bogies)
- Fuel type: Coal
- Fuel capacity: 6 LT (6.1 t)
- Water cap.: 2,855 imp gal (12,980 L)
- Firebox
  - Type: Round-top
  - Grate area: 26.75 sq ft (2.485 m^{2})
- Boiler
  - Pitch: 7 ft 1 in (2,159 mm)
  - Diameter: 4 ft 10 3/4 in (1,492 mm)
  - Tube plates: 14 ft 10 1/8 in (4,524 mm)
  - Small tubes: 159: 2 1/4 in (57 mm)
- Boiler pressure: 180 psi (1,241 kPa)
- Safety valve: Ramsbottom
- Heating surface
  - Firebox: 117.3 sq ft (10.90 m^{2})
  - Tubes: 1,391 sq ft (129.2 m^{2})
  - Total surface: 1,508.3 sq ft (140.13 m^{2})
- Cylinders: Two
- Cylinder size: 19 in (483 mm) bore 24 in (610 mm) stroke
- Valve gear: Stephenson
- Couplers: Johnston link-and-pin
Performance figures
- Tractive effort: 24,370 lbf (108.4 kN) @ 75%
Career
- Operators: Cape Government Railways; South African Railways
- Class: CGR 9th Class; SAR Class Experimental 4
- Number in class: 2
- Numbers: CGR 805-806, SAR 910-911
- Delivered: 1903
- First run: 1903
- Withdrawn: 1930
- The 2nd & 3rd coupled axles had flangeless wheels

The South African Railways Class Experimental 4 2-8-2 of 1903 was a steam locomotive from the pre-Union era in the Cape of Good Hope.

In 1903, the Cape Government Railways placed two 9th Class steam locomotives with a 2-8-2 Mikado type wheel arrangement in service. In 1912, when they were assimilated into the South African Railways, they were renumbered and designated Class Experimental 4.

== Manufacturer ==
The Cape 9th Class locomotive was designed by H.M. Beatty, the Locomotive Superintendent of the Cape Government Railways (CGR) from 1896 to 1910. They were the first South African locomotives to have a 2-8-2 Mikado wheel arrangement and they were built with bar frames, had Stephenson's Link valve gear and used saturated steam. Two locomotives were delivered by Kitson and Company in 1903, numbered 805 and 806.

== Characteristics ==
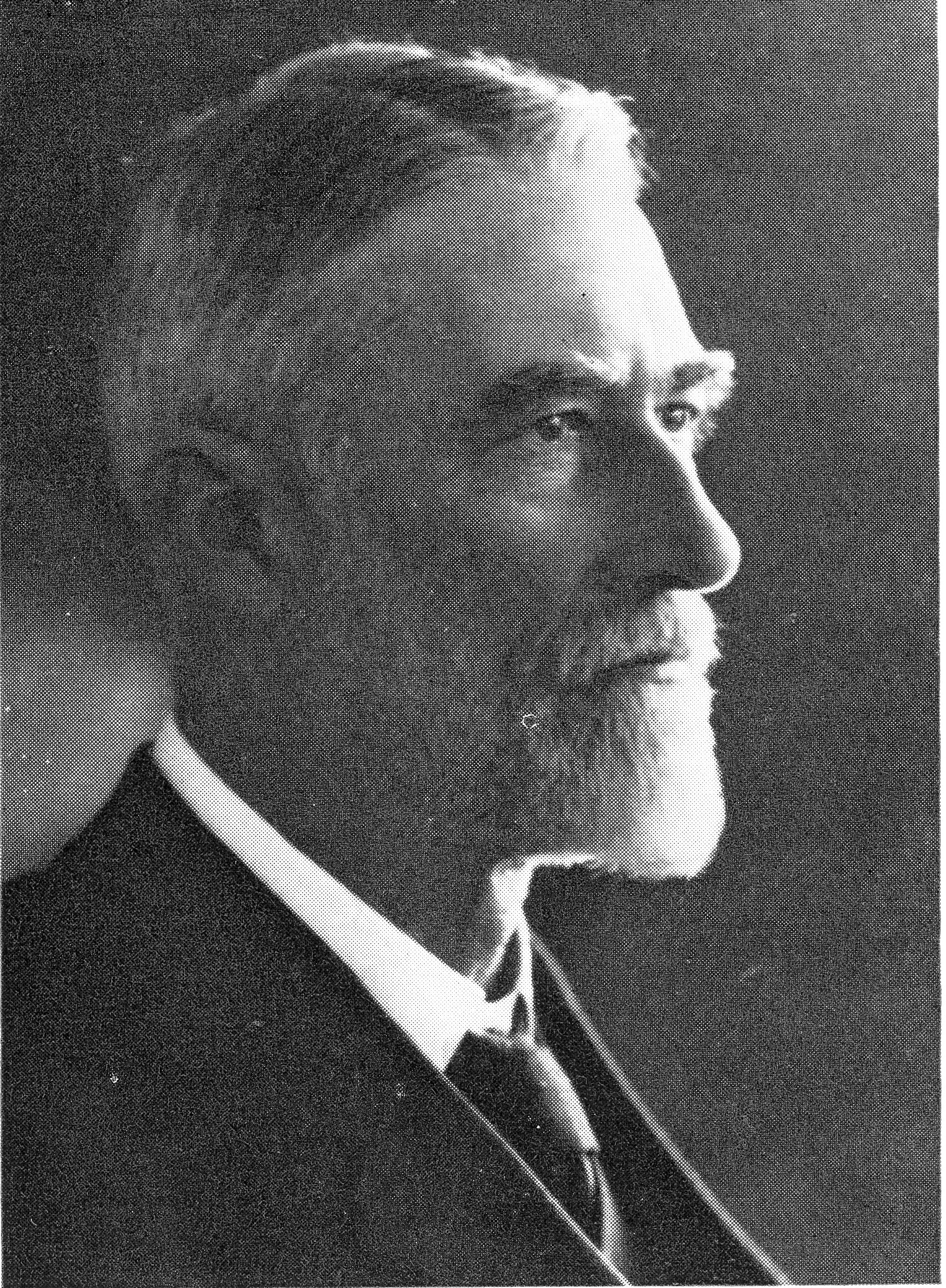
H.M. Beatty

The locomotives were delivered with Type XE1 tenders. Their intermediate and driving coupled wheels were flangeless to allow them to cope with tight curves, such as in turnouts.

With these locomotives, Beatty attempted to combine the best design features and good qualities of his Cape 8th Class 2-8-0 locomotive of 1901 with the improved steaming which was obtained from a wide firegrate. In many respects, they were enlarged versions of the two Cape 6th Class 2-6-2 locomotives which were delivered by Kitson in the same year, with many features in common.

== Performance ==
They were placed in service on the mainline between De Aar and Kimberley.

In comparison with the Cape 8th Class, it was found that their operational and maintenance costs were much higher without any advantage in terms of efficiency. As a result, no more of the type were ordered.

== Reclassification ==
When the Union of South Africa was established on 31 May 1910, the three Colonial government railways (CGR, Natal Government Railways and Central South African Railways) were united under a single administration to control and administer the railways, ports and harbours of the Union. Although the South African Railways and Harbours came into existence in 1910, the actual classification and renumbering of all the rolling stock of the three constituent railways were only implemented with effect from 1 January 1912.

In 1912, the locomotives were designated Class Experimental 4 and renumbered to 910 and 911 on the SAR. They were withdrawn from service and scrapped in 1930.
