= South African Class 8Y 2-8-0 =

1903 design of steam locomotive

CGR 8th Class 2-8-0 1903 South African Class 8Y 2-8-0
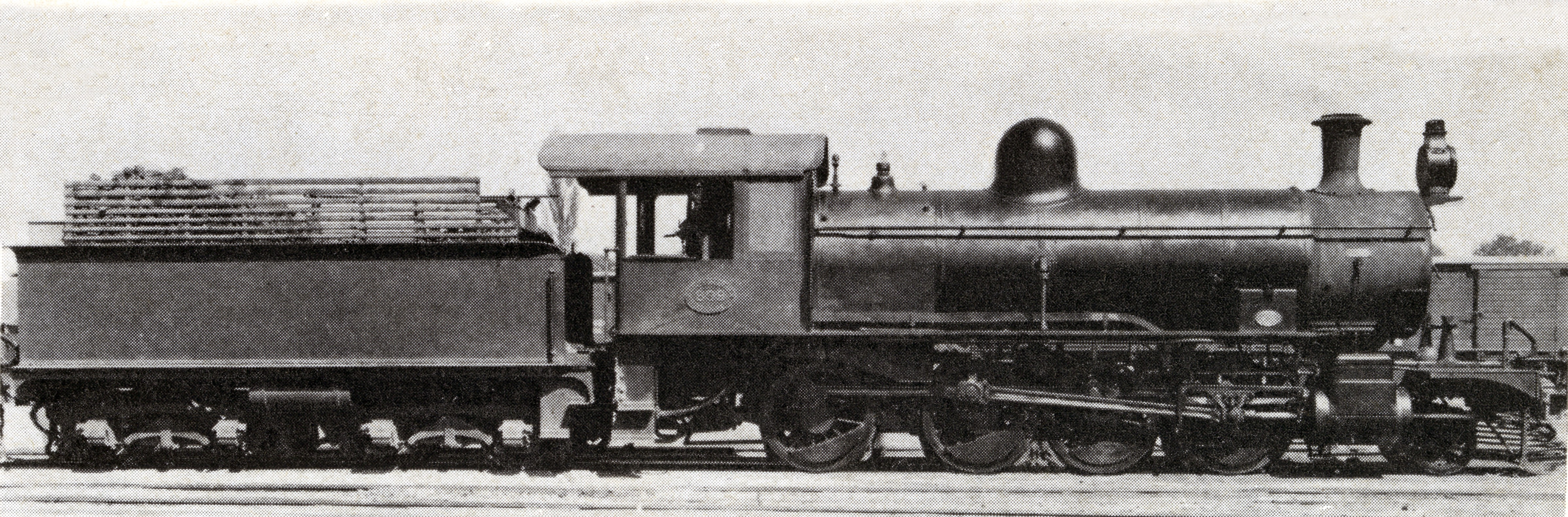
- CGR 8th Class no. 820, SAR Class 8Y no. 899
Type and origin
- Power type: Steam
- Designer: Cape Government Railways (H.M. Beatty)
- Builder: Kitson and Company
- Serial number: 4198-4201
- Model: CGR 8th Class (2-8-0)
- Build date: 1903
- Total produced: 4
Specifications
- Configuration
  - Whyte: 2-8-0 (Consolidation)
  - UIC: 1'Dn2
- Driver: 3rd coupled axle
- Gauge: 3 ft 6 in (1,067 mm) Cape gauge
- Leading dia.: 28 1/2 in (724 mm)
- Coupled dia.: 48 in (1,219 mm)
- Tender wheels: 33 1/2 in (851 mm) as built 34 in (864 mm) retyred
- Wheelbase: 46 ft 10 1/2 in (14,288 mm)
  - Axle spacing (Asymmetrical): 1-2: 4 ft 7 in (1,397 mm); 2-3: 4 ft 3 in (1,295 mm); 3-4: 5 ft 8 in (1,727 mm)
  - Engine: 21 ft 8 in (6,604 mm)
  - Coupled: 14 ft 6 in (4,420 mm)
  - Tender: 14 ft 7 in (4,445 mm)
  - Tender bogie: 4 ft 7 in (1,397 mm)
- Length
  - Over couplers: 54 ft 9 in (16,688 mm)
- Height: 12 ft 10 in (3,912 mm)
- Frame type: Bar
- Axle load: 12 LT 8 cwt (12,600 kg)
  - Leading: 6 LT 8 cwt (6,503 kg)
  - Coupled: 12 LT 8 cwt (12,600 kg)
- Adhesive weight: 49 LT 12 cwt (50,400 kg)
- Loco weight: 56 LT (56,900 kg)
- Tender type: XE1 (2-axle bogies)
- Fuel type: Coal
- Fuel capacity: 9 LT (9.1 t)
- Water cap.: 2,855 imp gal (13,000 L)
- Firebox
  - Type: Round-top
  - Grate area: 30.9 sq ft (2.87 m^{2})
- Boiler
  - Pitch: 7 ft 3 in (2,210 mm)
  - Diameter: 4 ft 10 3/4 in (1,492 mm)
  - Tube plates: 12 ft 7 3/8 in (3,845 mm)
  - Small tubes: 196: 2 in (51 mm)
- Boiler pressure: 180 psi (1,241 kPa)
- Safety valve: Ramsbottom
- Heating surface
  - Firebox: 105 sq ft (9.8 m^{2})
  - Tubes: 1,311.5 sq ft (121.84 m^{2})
  - Total surface: 1,416.5 sq ft (131.60 m^{2})
- Cylinders: Two
- Cylinder size: 18 1/2 in (470 mm) bore 24 in (610 mm) stroke
- Valve gear: Stephenson
- Valve type: Slide
- Couplers: Johnston link-and-pin AAR knuckle (1930s)
Performance figures
- Tractive effort: 23,110 lbf (102.8 kN) @ 75%
Career
- Operators: Cape Government Railways; South African Railways
- Class: CGR 8th Class (2-8-0); SAR Class 8Y
- Number in class: 4
- Numbers: CGR 817-820, SAR 896-899
- Delivered: 1903
- First run: 1903
- Withdrawn: 1938
- The 2nd & 3rd coupled axles had flangeless wheels

The South African Railways Class 8Y 2-8-0 of 1903 was a steam locomotive from the pre-Union era in the Cape of Good Hope.

In 1903, the Cape Government Railways placed four more Cape 8th Class 2-8-0 Consolidation type steam locomotives in service. In 1912, when they were assimilated into the South African Railways, they were renumbered and designated Class 8Y.

== Manufacturer ==
The first locomotive in the Cape Government Railways (CGR) 2-8-0 Consolidation type 8th Class, later to be designated the South African Railways (SAR) Class 8X, was designed by H.M. Beatty, the CGR’s Chief Locomotive Superintendent from 1896 to 1910. This second batch of four engines was ordered in 1903 from Kitson and Company of Hunslet in Leeds, West Yorkshire. All four were allocated to the CGR’s Western System and numbered in the range from 817 to 820.

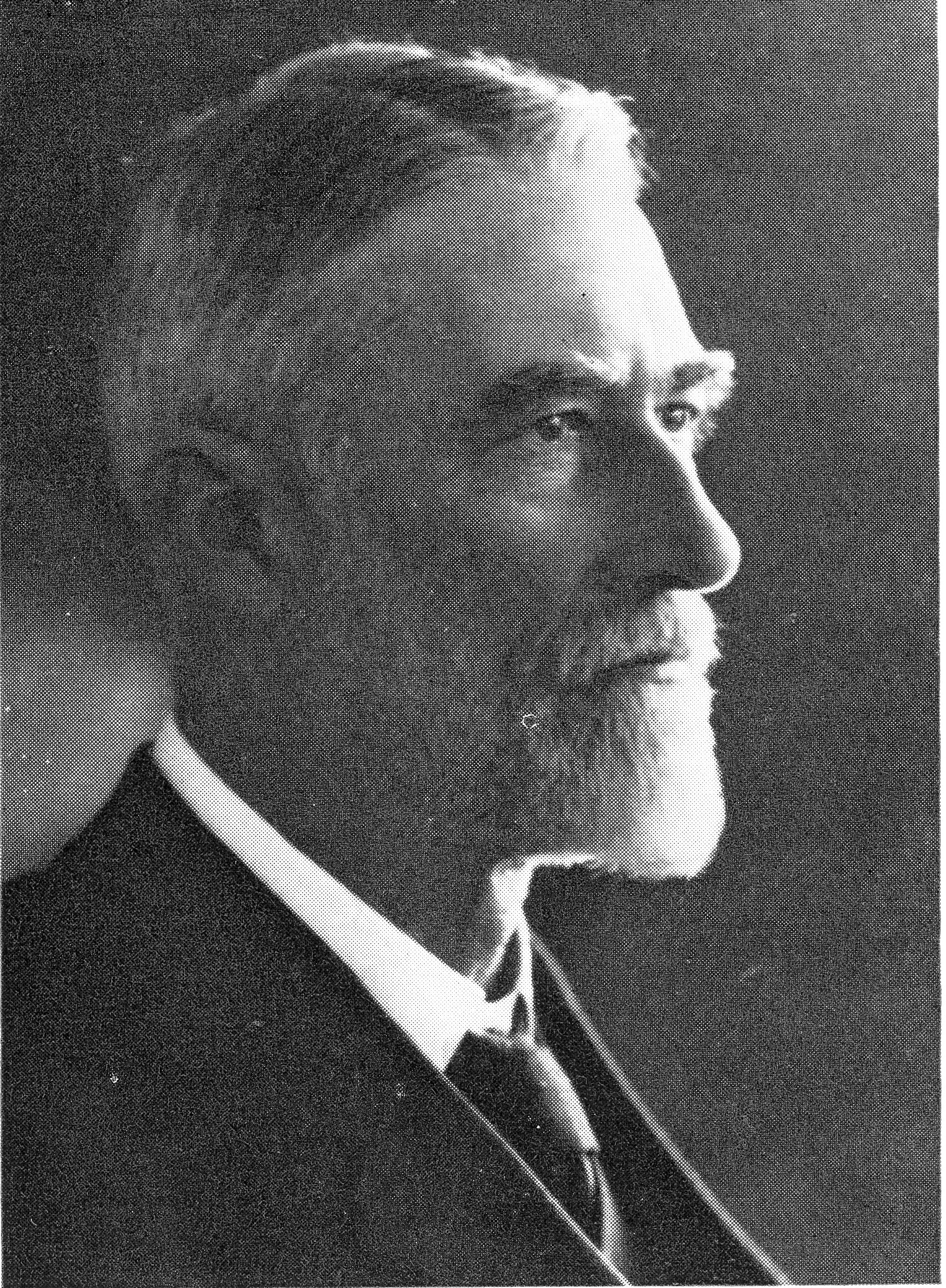
H.M. Beatty

They were very similar to the earlier CGR Schenectady- and ALCO-built Consolidations, but with the boiler centre line raised by 2 inches (51 millimetres). Coupled with a shallow firebox, this enabled the firegrate to be extended out sideways over the fourth set of coupled wheels, which resulted in a grate area of 30.9 square feet (2.87 square metres), compared to the 20 square feet (1.9 square metres) of the previous model. These engines also used saturated steam and cylinders with overhead slide valves, actuated by inside Stephenson valve gear.

== Class 8 sub-classes ==
In spite of the difference in wheel arrangement, the CGR grouped its 2-8-0 Consolidation and post-7th Class 4-8-0 Mastodon locomotives together as the 8th Class.

When the Union of South Africa was established on 31 May 1910, the three Colonial government railways (CGR, Natal Government Railways and Central South African Railways) were united under a single administration to control and administer the railways, ports and harbours of the Union. Although the South African Railways and Harbours came into existence in 1910, the actual classification and renumbering of all the rolling stock of the three constituent railways were only implemented with effect from 1 January 1912.

In 1912, these four locomotives were designated Class 8Y on the South African Railways (SAR) and renumbered in the range from 896 to 899. All the CGR 8th Class 2-8-0 and 4-8-0 locomotives, together with the Classes 8-L1 to 8-L3 4-8-0 Mastodon locomotives from the Central South African Railways (CSAR), were grouped into ten different sub-classes by the SAR. The 4-8-0 locomotives became SAR Classes 8 and 8A to 8F and the 2-8-0 locomotives became Classes 8X to 8Z.

== Service ==
In SAR service, the 2-8-0 Class 8Y was used mainly in the Northern Cape until they were withdrawn by 1938.
