= Class 33 =

Class 33 may refer to:

- British Rail Class 33, a British diesel locomotive class.
- The following German, passenger train, steam locomotives with a 4-8-0 wheel arrangement operated by the Deutsche Reichsbahn:
  - Class 33.0: BBÖ 570
  - Class 33.1: BBÖ 113
  - Class 33.2: PKP Class Os24
