= Queensland C18 class locomotive =

Class of Australian 4-8-0 locomotives

Queensland Railways C18 class
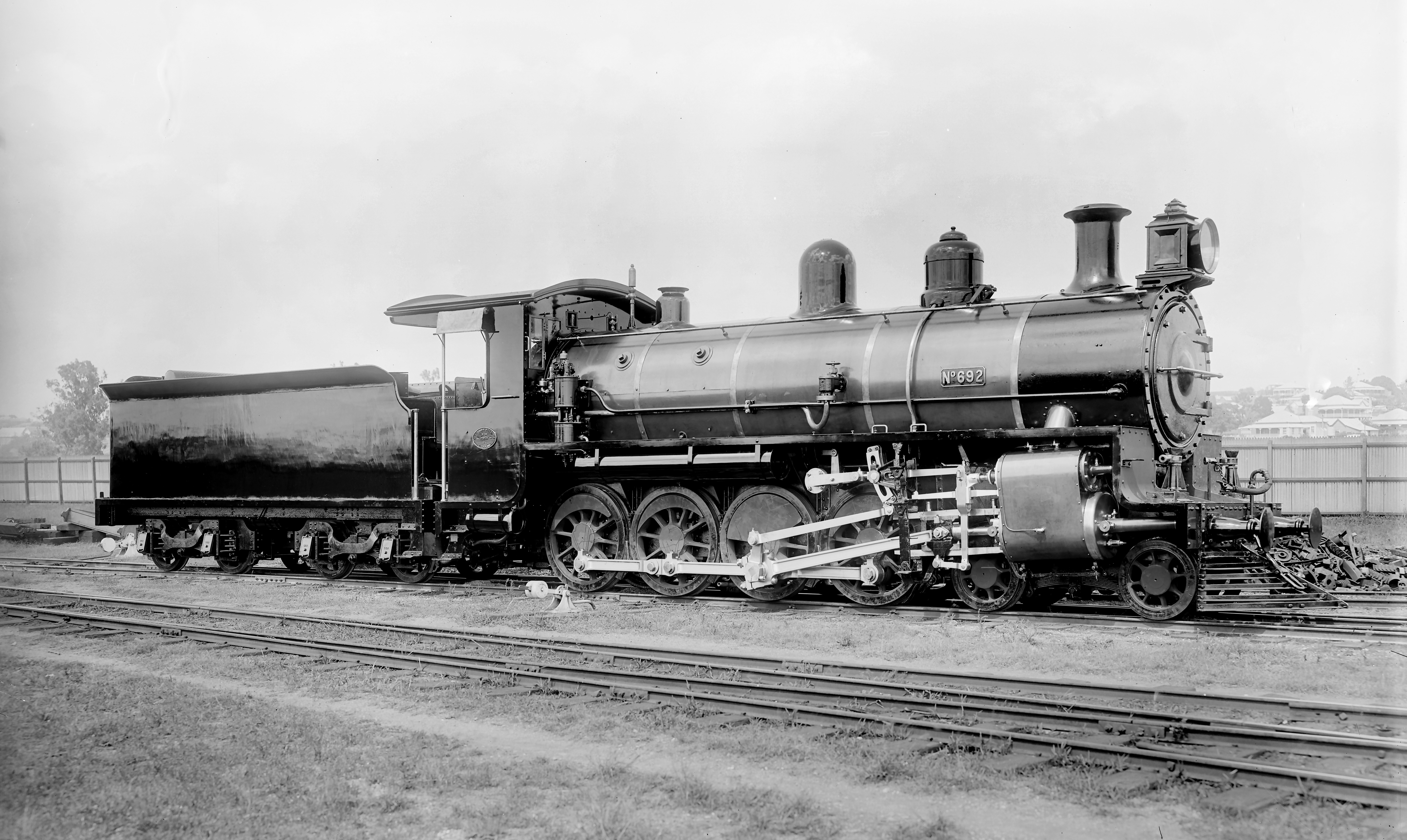
- C18 Class Locomotive No.692 Ipswich Depot
Type and origin
- Power type: Steam
- Builder: North Ipswich Railway Workshops
- Build date: 1914
- Total produced: 3
Specifications
- Configuration
  - Whyte: 4-8-0
- Gauge: 1,067 mm (3 ft 6 in)
- Length: 55 ft 10 in (17.02 m)
- Fuel type: Coal
- Cylinders: 2
Career
- Operators: Queensland Railways
- Numbers: 692-694
- Disposition: all scrapped

The Queensland Railways C18 class locomotive was a class of 4-8-0 steam locomotives operated by the Queensland Railways.

== History ==
In 1914, the Queensland Railways built three locomotives at North Ipswich Railway Workshops. Per Queensland Railway's classification system they were designated the C18 class, C representing they had four driving axles, and the 18 the cylinder diameter in inches.

The class was built to test the merits of superheaters. They were fitted with a saturated boiler (692), Schmidt superheater (693) and Robinson superheater (694). Judged a success, 692 was fitted with a Robinson superheater in December 1916. Further examples were planned with the completion of the North Coast line, but the C19 class were ordered instead.

They originally operated the Sydney Mail from Brisbane to Toowoomba, being extended to Wallangarra in April 1915. From 1918 the operated to Bundaberg and Roma from 1928.

In March 1915, 693 was named Sir William MacGregor and 694 Lady MacGregor after the Governor of Queensland and his wife. All were converted to CC19 class with fitting of 19 inch cylinders in the 1930s.
