= Ceylon Government Railway A1 and A2 =

4-8-0 steam banking locomotives used by British Ceylon

The Ceylon Government Railway A1 & A2 were two similar classes of 4-8-0 steam banking locomotives used by the national rail operator of British Ceylon (now Sri Lanka). These locomotives were collectively a part of the BB (Big Bank) Class at first, before being split into two distinct classes during the reclassification of 1937. These locomotives were ordered for banking duties on the Kadugannawa incline to replace the then aging F Class locomotives. No locomotive from either of the two classes has survived into preservation.

== Class A1 ==
Ceylon Government Railway A1
Type and origin
- Power type: Steam
- Builder: Kitson
- Build date: 1913-1914 (A1); 1922 (A1A)
- Total produced: 4
Specifications
- Configuration
  - Whyte: 4-8-0
- Gauge: 5 ft 6 in (1,676 mm)
- Driver dia.: 43 in (1.092 m)
- Length: 59 ft 1.5 in
- Axle load: 16 long ton
- Loco weight: 76.55 long ton
- Tender weight: 40.40 long ton
- Fuel type: Coal
- Water cap.: 3000 gal
- Boiler pressure: 160 lb/sq.in (superheated)
- Cylinders: 2 (outside)
- Cylinder size: 21 in × 24 in (530 mm × 610 mm)
- Valve gear: Walschaerts with piston valves
Performance figures
- Tractive effort: 33,475 lbf (148.90 kN)
Career
- Operators: Ceylon Government Railway
- Numbers: 18, 19, 41 (A1); 42 (A1A)
- Disposition: All scrapped

A sub-class designated as the A1A also existed for this class.

== Class A2 ==
Ceylon Government Railway A2
Type and origin
- Power type: Steam
- Builder: Kitson
- Build date: 1911
- Total produced: 2
Specifications
- Configuration
  - Whyte: 4-8-0
- Gauge: 5 ft 6 in (1,676 mm)
- Driver dia.: 43 in (1.092 m)
- Length: 58 ft
- Axle load: 16 long ton
- Loco weight: 76.30 long ton
- Tender weight: 40.40 long ton
- Fuel type: Coal
- Water cap.: 3000 gal
- Boiler pressure: 160 lb/sq.in
- Cylinders: 2 (outside)
- Cylinder size: 21 in × 24 in (530 mm × 610 mm)
- Valve gear: Walschaerts with slide valves later converted to piston valves
Performance figures
- Tractive effort: 33,475 lbf (148.90 kN)
Career
- Operators: Ceylon Government Railway
- Numbers: 16 (later 155); 17 (later 156)
- Disposition: All scrapped

These locomotives were originally not superheated.
