= South African Class 17 4-8-0TT =

1926 design of steam locomotive

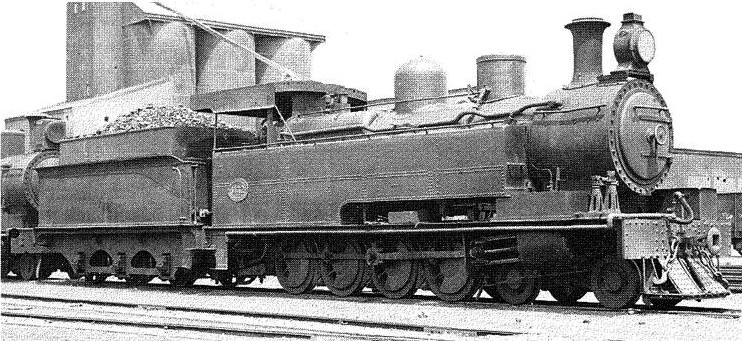
- SAR Class 17 no. 1432, circa 1930
Type and origin
- Power type: Steam
- Designer: Natal Government Railways (William Milne)
- Builder: Dübs and Company; South African Railways
- Serial number: See table
- Model: SAR Class 17
- Build date: 1926-1929
- Total produced: 21
Specifications
- Configuration
  - Whyte: 4-8-0TT (Mastodon)
  - UIC: 2’Dn2t
- Driver: 2nd coupled axle
- Gauge: 3 ft 6 in (1,067 mm) Cape gauge
- Leading dia.: 25 3/4 in (654 mm)
- Coupled dia.: 39 in (991 mm)
- Tender wheels: 34 in (864 mm)
- Wheelbase: 44 ft 11 1/2 in (13,703 mm)
  - Engine: 19 ft 9 in (6,020 mm)
  - Leading: 5 ft (1,524 mm)
  - Coupled: 11 ft (3,353 mm)
  - Tender: 16 ft 1 in (4,902 mm)
  - Tender bogie: 4 ft 7 in (1,397 mm)
- Length
  - Over couplers: 52 ft 2 1/2 in (15,913 mm)
- Height: 12 ft 2 1/2 in (3,721 mm)
- Frame type: Plate
- Axle load: 8 LT 10 cwt (8,636 kg)
  - Leading: 9 LT 6 cwt (9,449 kg)
  - 1st coupled: 8 LT 2 cwt (8,230 kg)
  - 2nd coupled: 8 LT 10 cwt (8,636 kg)
  - 3rd coupled: 8 LT 3 cwt (8,281 kg)
  - 4th coupled: 8 LT 3 cwt (8,281 kg)
  - Tender bogie: Bogie 1: 16 LT 15 cwt (17,020 kg); Bogie 2: 17 LT 18 cwt (18,190 kg)
- Adhesive weight: 32 LT 18 cwt (33,430 kg)
- Loco weight: 42 LT 4 cwt (42,880 kg)
- Tender weight: 34 LT 13 cwt (35,210 kg)
- Total weight: 76 LT 17 cwt (78,080 kg)
- Tender type: 2-axle bogies or 3-axle
- Fuel type: Coal
- Fuel capacity: 5 LT 10 cwt (5.6 t)
- Water cap.: 1,358 imp gal (6,170 L) engine
- Tender cap.: 2,600 imp gal (11,800 L) tender
- Firebox
  - Type: Belpaire
  - Grate area: 24 sq ft (2.2 m^{2})
- Boiler
  - Pitch: 7 ft (2,134 mm)
  - Diameter: 3 ft 10 3/4 in (1,187 mm)
  - Tube plates: 10 ft 10 1/8 in (3,305 mm)
  - Small tubes: 187: 1 3/4 in (44 mm)
- Boiler pressure: 160 psi (1,103 kPa)
- Safety valve: Ramsbottom
- Heating surface
  - Firebox: 62 sq ft (5.8 m^{2})
  - Tubes: 930 sq ft (86 m^{2})
  - Total surface: 992 sq ft (92.2 m^{2})
- Cylinders: Two
- Cylinder size: 17 in (432 mm) bore 21 in (533 mm) stroke
- Valve gear: Stephenson
- Valve type: Slide
- Couplers: Johnston link-and-pin AAR knuckle (1930s)
Performance figures
- Tractive effort: 18,670 lbf (83.0 kN) @ 75%
Career
- Operators: South African Railways
- Class: Class 17
- Number in class: 21
- Numbers: 1415–1435
- Delivered: 1926-1929
- First run: 1926
- Withdrawn: 1961
- The leading coupled axle had flangeless wheels

The South African Railways Class 17 4-8-0TT of 1926 was a steam locomotive from the pre-Union era in the Natal Colony.

Between 1926 and 1929, to address a shortage of suitable shunting locomotives, the South African Railways rebuilt twenty-one Class A 4-8-2 Mountain type tank steam locomotives to Class 17 4-8-0 Mastodon type tank-and-tender locomotives.

== Manufacturers ==
The Natal Government Railways (NGR) Class D 4-8-2T Mountain type tank locomotive was designed by William Milne, the locomotive superintendent of the NGR from 1877 to 1896, and built by Dübs and Company. One hundred of these locomotives were delivered in ten batches by Dübs between 1888 and 1899 and in 1915 another two were built from spare parts by the South African Railways (SAR) in their Durban shops.

== Belpaire firebox ==
Beginning in 1905, these NGR Class D locomotives, originally known on the NGR as the "Dübs A", were gradually reboilered and fitted with Belpaire fireboxes with wider firegrates. The unmodified locomotives were then designated NGR Class D1 while the modified locomotives with Belpaire fireboxes were designated Class D2.

In SAR service, the NGR Class D1 and D2 were both designated Class A in 1912 while the modified locomotives were referred to as Class A Belpaire.

== Rebuilding ==
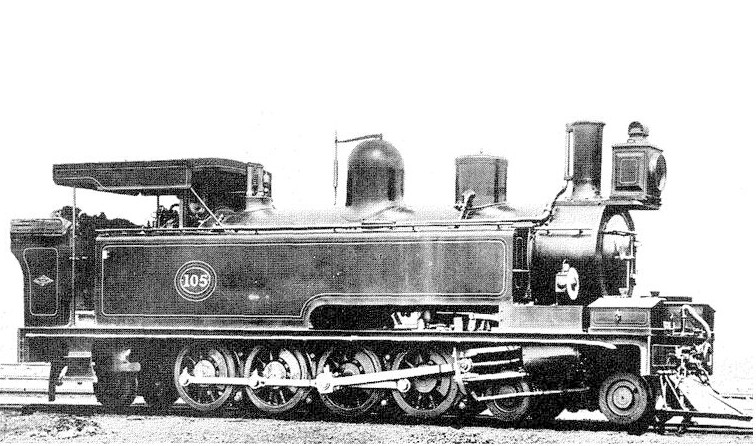
NGR Class D1 no. 105, c. 1900

When a shortage of suitable shunting locomotives developed in the 1920s as a result of increasing traffic throughout the country and particularly on the Witwatersrand, the SAR modified twenty-one of the Class A Belpaire 4-8-2 Mountain type tank locomotives.

The modifications were done between 1926 and 1929 and consisted of the removal of their trailing bissel bogies and coal bunkers, the shortening of their main frames and the addition of tenders to increase their coal and water capacity, thereby converting them to 4-8-0 Mastodon type tank-and-tender locomotives.

Tenders from various scrapped locomotive types were used. The tender depicted in the main picture is a three-axle tender while the official SAR locomotive diagram depicts a tender with four axles on two bogies.

== Service ==
These rebuilt 4-8-2TT locomotives were reclassified to Class 17 and renumbered in the range from 1415 to 1435. They were employed as shunting engines around Durban, Pietermaritzburg and Port Elizabeth and gave more than thirty years service in this format. In October 1957 Pietermaritzburg's last two Class 17s were transferred from Masons Mill to Greyville near Durban. The locomotives were all withdrawn from service by 1961, more than seventy years after the first Class A locomotive was built.

In November 1953 two of these locomotives, numbers 1423 and 1431, were purchased by the Zambezi Saw Mills Company for use on their Livingstone-Mulobezi logging railway in Northern Rhodesia. These two engines were scrapped between 1961 and 1963.

== Works numbers and renumbering ==
Class A Belpaire rebuilt to Class 17
Class 17 no.	Year built	NGR Class D2 no.	SAR Class A no.	Dübs works no.
1415	1898	113	158	3556
1416	1897	108	154	3484
1417	1890	68	116	2611
1418	1899	134	190	3820
1419	1890	82	128	2625
1420	1890	75	122	2618
1421	1890	61	109	2604
1422	1895	89	135	3317
1423	1890	80	193	2626
1424	1898	120	166	3563
1425	1890	71	119	2614
1426	1895	90	136	3318
1427	1890	69	117	2612
1428	1890	70	118	2613
1429	1899	143	181	3829
1430	1899	141	191	3827
1431	1897	105	151	3481
1432	1898	112	157	3605
1433	1890	83	129	2623
1434	1897	101	147	3477
1435	1898	121	163	3564
