= Queensland C19 class locomotive =

Class of Australian 4-8-0 locomotives

Queensland Railways C19 class
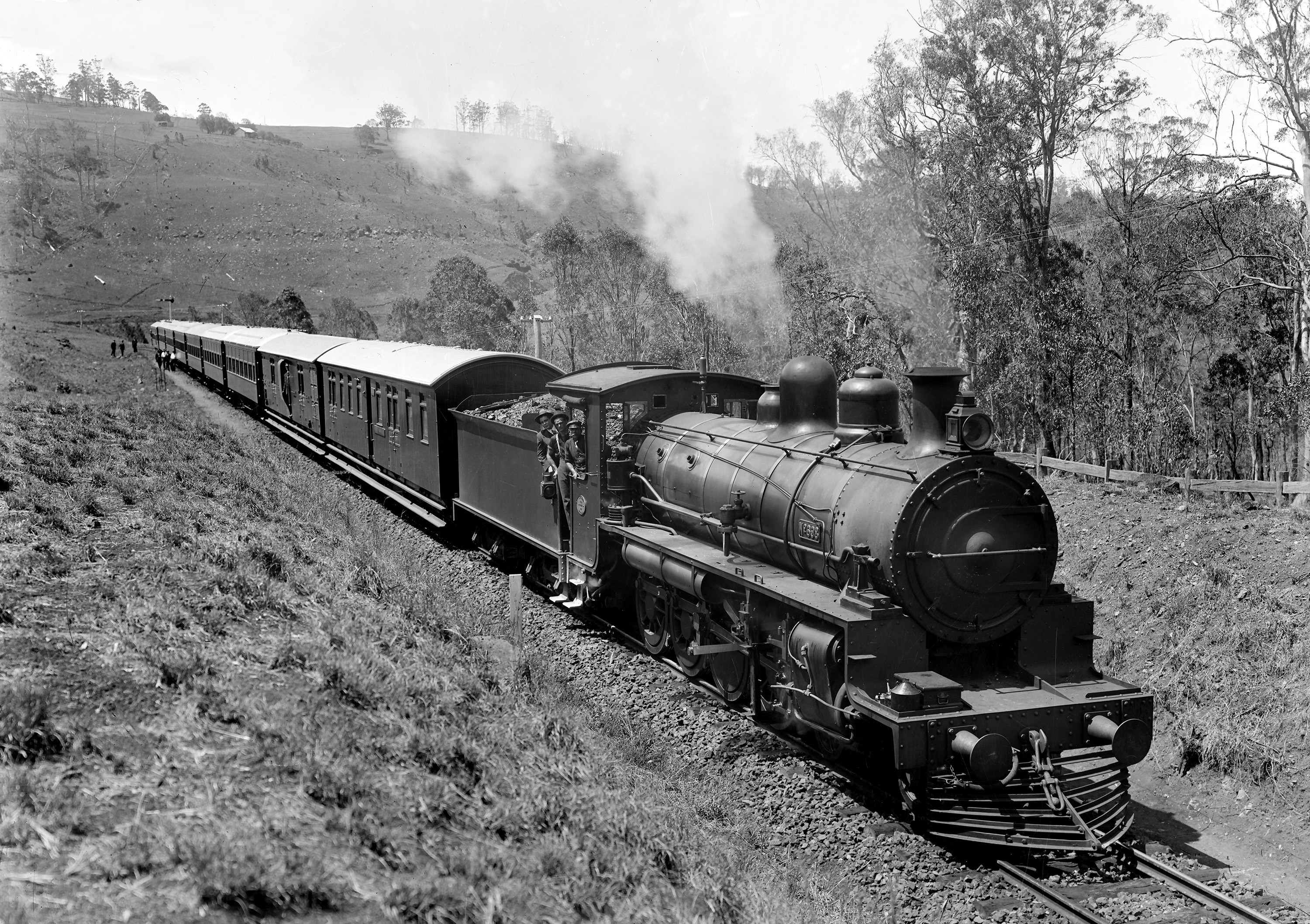
- C19 698 hauling a mail train in Little Liverpool Range
Type and origin
- Power type: Steam
- Builder: North Ipswich Railway Workshops (20); Walkers Limited (6)
- Build date: 1922-1935
- Total produced: 26
Specifications
- Configuration
  - Whyte: 4-8-0
- Gauge: 1,067 mm (3 ft 6 in)
- Driver dia.: 4 ft 0 in (1.219 m)
- Fuel type: Coal
- Boiler pressure: 160 lbf/in^{2} (1,103 kPa)
- Cylinders: 2 outside
- Cylinder size: 19 in × 23 in (483 mm × 584 mm)
Performance figures
- Tractive effort: 23,525 lbf (104.64 kN)
Career
- Operators: Queensland Railways
- Numbers: 695-704, 792-801, 196-201
- Preserved: 700
- Disposition: 1 preserved, 25 scrapped

The Queensland Railways C19 class locomotive was a class of 4-8-0 steam locomotives operated by the Queensland Railways.

== History ==
The C19 class was designed as a superheated version of the C18 class. Per Queensland Railway's classification system they were designated the C19 class, C representing they had four driving axles, and the 19 the cylinder diameter in inches.

The North Ipswich Railway Workshops built 20 between 1922 and 1928. A further six were built by Walkers Limited in 1935. They worked the heavily graded Main, Southern, North Coast and Western lines.

Nº 702 entered traffic in December 1923 and was named Centenary as it was the hundredth engine constructed by North Ipswich Railway Workshops. In April 1927, 699 operated a Royal train carrying the Duchess of York and in December 1934, 700 carried the Duke of Gloucester.

A number of modifications were made over the years. The early engines had a large regulator dome and another smaller one for the safety valves similar to the B17 class. Those built from 1926 onwards had a boiler with only one small dome that contained both regulator and safety valves. Earlier engines later received this type as they became due for re-boilering. Both the initial and the subsequent boilers shared a firebox having a long, narrow grate which required considerable effort on the part of the fireman, and rendered them unpopular.

The engines suffered from a number of defects and were prone to cracked frames. As their condition deteriorated and with the introduction of modern engines and later DEL for heavy traffic, the engines were relegated to lesser duties and most were withdrawn during the 1950s. Three engines that had been written off the books were returned to service for short periods in the late 1950s to overcome motive power shortages at that time.

Nº 800 was retained at Maryborough as a stationary steam plant for some years after being written off in April 1956.

Several C19 tenders were kept in a pool at Ipswich after their engines had been withdrawn. These tenders were then fitted temporarily to overhauled C17/B18¼/BB18¼ engines that were ready to return to service but their respective tenders were not yet available.

The last engine in service was Nº 700 at Toowoomba and was written off the books in February 1964.

== Preservation ==
One example has been preserved:

- 700 at the Workshops Rail Museum
