= Mizens Railway =

UK railway line

Coordinates: 51.32633°N 0.61310°W

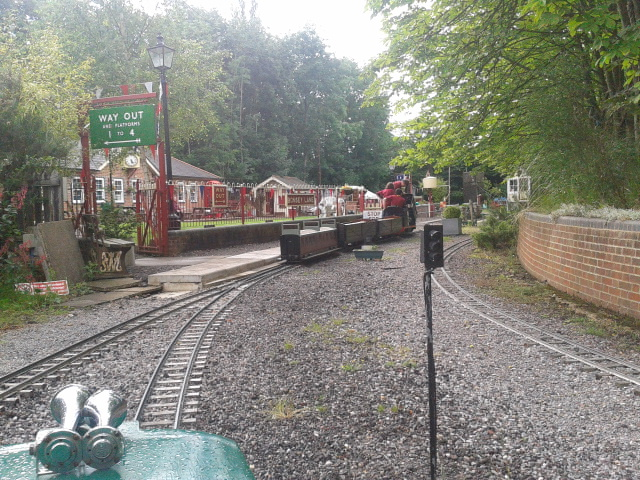
Bonsey Lane Station is one of the two stations which are terminals along a short but varied landscape route

Mizens Railway is a 7¼ inch gauge miniature railway located in a 10-acre site near Woking in Surrey, England. The railway comprises three routes, the longest being nearly 1 mile long. A variety of locomotives are in use, including several steam engines.

The railway was named after its original location at Mizens Farm, now the headquarters of McLaren until moving to the present site in 2000.

== Routes ==
Three routes are operated by the railway on public running days, The Suburban, the Miler and the Highlander. A maximum of two of these routes can be operated at one time for the public.

The Highlander saw its testing in mid-2014 with limited passenger runs. Technical difficulties prohibited opening in 2014 with final testing occurring in early 2015 before the start of the running season. Due to the demanding gradients of this route, it is only opened to the public in dry conditions and depending on the availability of locomotives and coaching stock. Trains on this route start and end their journey at platform 3.

== Signalling ==
The railway is controlled by a variety of signals. Many signals on the main line are controlled automatically but most signals around the train station are controlled from the south signal box. The north signal box is being installed to control the new 'Highland' route. Construction of the north signal box and its signals are nearing completion and is hoped to be in service in the 2015 train running season. Both signal boxes are controlled with 20 half-size levers and a variety of buttons to operate shunt signals. Basic electronic interlocking is in use where appropriate. All of the automatic signals on the track are 2 or 3 aspect color light signals which operate using track circuit equipment. Many of the signals in the station are of a LMS semaphore type, and are built near to scale.

== Standard gauge and larger narrow gauge rolling stock ==
The site contains several larger items of railway rolling stock on static display. The largest of these is the British Rail Class 423 (also known as 4-VEP) driving trailer unit number 76887 from unit 3568. A platform and protective roof have been constructed over the coach to protect it from the rain. At the gate of the site a South African Class A 4-8-2T tank stands on a short section of track. The locomotive moved to the Woking site in 2011 by ship from Richard Bay in South Africa to Bristol Portbury Docks, and then by road transport to Woking.

== Miniature locomotives ==
Mizens railway has a variety of locomotives to drive the trains. These are powered by a variety of steam, petrol and battery electric power and can be seen on the front of the trains. Most locomotives are owned by members of the Railway and are also used on a regular basis.
