= BBÖ 113 =

BBÖ 113 DRB 33.1 ÖBB 33
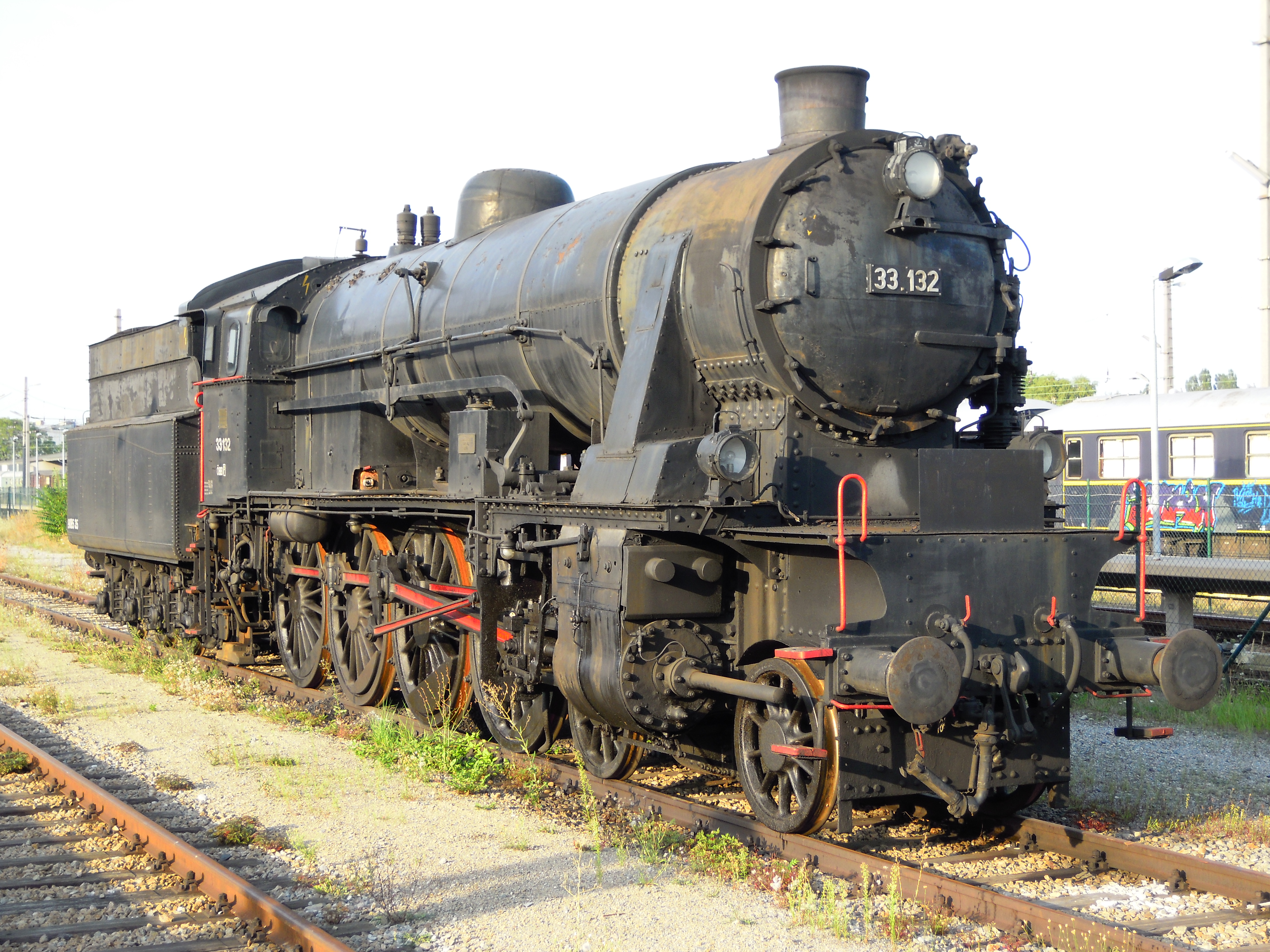
- Locomotive 33.132 in 2011
Type and origin
- Builder: Lokomotivfabrik der StEG (33); Lokomotivfabrik Floridsdorf (7)
- Build date: 1923–1928
- Total produced: 40
Specifications
- Configuration
  - Whyte: 4-8-0
- Gauge: 1,435 mm (4 ft 8 1/2 in)
- Leading dia.: 1,034 mm (3 ft 4 3/4 in)
- Driver dia.: 1,740 mm (5 ft 8 1/2 in)
- Wheelbase
  - Overall: 9,540 mm (31 ft 3 1/2 in)
  - incl. tender: 17,174 mm (56 ft 4 1/4 in)
- Length
  - Over beams: 20,698 mm (67 ft 11 in)
- Height: 4,650 mm (15 ft 3 1/8 in)
- Adhesive weight: 59.4 t (58.5 long tons; 65.5 short tons)
- Service weight: 85.2 t (83.9 long tons; 93.9 short tons)
- Tender type: 85
- Fuel capacity: 7.44 m^{3} (263 cu ft) of coal
- Water cap.: 27.0 m^{3} (950 cu ft)
- Boiler
  - Tube plates: 9,966 mm (32 ft 8 1/4 in)
- No. of heating tubes: 151
- No. of smoke tubes: 32
- Heating tube length: 5,200 mm (17 ft 3/4 in)
- Boiler pressure: 15 kgf/cm^{2} (1.47 MPa; 213 lbf/in^{2})
- Heating surface
  - Firebox: 4.47 m^{2} (48.1 sq ft)
  - Radiative: 16.10 m^{2} (173.3 sq ft)
  - Tubes: 187.90 m^{2} (2,022.5 sq ft)
- Superheater
  - Heating area: 69.5 m^{2} (748 sq ft)
- Cylinders: 2
- Cylinder size: 560 mm (22 1/16 in)
- Piston stroke: 720 mm (28 3/8 in)
Performance figures
- Maximum speed: 100 or 85 km/h (62 or 53 mph)
Career
- Numbers: BBÖ: 113.01 – 113.40; DRB: 33 101 – 33 140; ÖBB: 33.101–33.140
- Retired: 1968

The BBÖ 113 was a class of 40 express train, 4-8-0 tender locomotives operated by the Federal Railway of Austria (Bundesbahnen Österreichs, BBÖ).

== History ==
After World War I new locomotives had to be built for the Austrian Western Railway due to increasing train loads and the replacement of old, wooden, passenger coaches with steel-bodied coaches. A 4-8-0 design was chosen which was based in many respects on the Class 570 of the Austrian Southern Railway, but which, at the same time, had numerous improvements. Between 1923 and 1928 40 locomotives of this new Class 113 were taken into service with the BBÖ.

This class was very powerful and much liked by locomotive crews. It was employed on the most important passenger train duties and in front of express and fast trains (Eilzüge) and fulfilled its role on main lines well until the end of the steam era, when its top speed of 85 km/h was no longer considered enough. In 1939, the Deutsche Reichsbahn took these locomotives over as DRG Class 33 101–140. In 1953 there were still 33 engines left in the ÖBB, their Reichsbahn numbers being retained. All were retired by 1968.

50 close copies were of Class 570 were built in Poland by Fablok and StEG, as PKP Class Os24. Class 113 was further developed in Hungary, where 514 MÁV Class 424 were built for Hungary, Yugoslavia and North Korea.

== Preserved locomotives ==
Number 33.102 has been preserved for the Austrian Railway Museum (Österreichische Eisenbahnmuseum) and is based today at the Strasshof Railway Museum (Eisenbahnmuseum Strasshof) in Lower Austria.

In the 1980s a preserved example JŽ 10-005 (previously JŽ 06ᴵ-105) in Yugoslavia was bought by private firm and restored to operational status. Today this engine has the fictitious number 33.132 and is available for heritage trips. Its original number when built was BBÖ 113.32 (StEG 4741/1925) and used in Austria.

A single Os24 locomotive exists in Poland, which can be regarded more as a Polish copy of the Class 570 predecessor.

| Number | Image | Built | Status | Owner/Location |
|---|---|---|---|---|
| 33.102 | | 1923 | Exhibit | TMW / Strasshof Railway Museum |
| 33.132 | | 1925 | Repair | Výtopna Dolní Lipka, Czech Republic |
| Os24-7 | | 1926 | Cosmetically restored | Warsaw Railway Museum / Warsaw |

== See also ==
- Deutsche Reichsbahn
- List of DRG locomotives and railbuses
