= South African Class A 4-8-2T =

1888 design of steam locomotive

NGR Class D1 & D2 4-8-2T South African Class A 4-8-2T
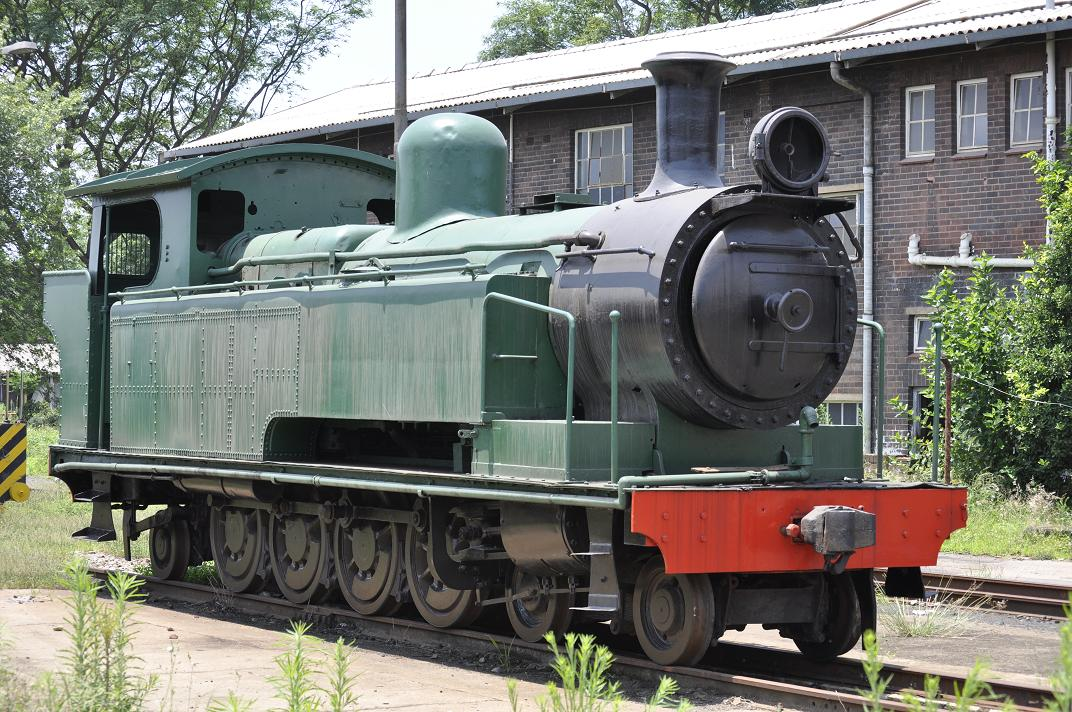
- SAR Class A Belpaire no. 196, ex NGR no 133, at Masons Mill, Pietermaritzburg, 10 December 2010
Type and origin
- ♠ – Round-top firebox ♥ – Belpaire firebox
- Power type: Steam
- Designer: Natal Government Railways (William Milne)
- Builder: Dübs and Company; South African Railways
- Serial number: 2446–2451, 2499–2504, 2604–2628, 2965–2967, 3317–3322, 3363–3368, 3477–3486, 3604–3605, 3556–3567, 3811–3834
- Build date: 1888–1915
- Total produced: 102
- Rebuilder: South African Railways
- Rebuild date: 1926
- Number rebuilt: 21 to Class 17 4-8-0TT (Mastodon)
Specifications
- Configuration
  - Whyte: 4-8-2T (Mountain)
  - UIC: 2'D1'n2t
- Driver: 2nd coupled axle
- Gauge: 3 ft 6 in (1,067 mm) Cape gauge
- Leading dia.: 25 3/4 in (654 mm)
- Coupled dia.: 39 in (991 mm)
- Trailing dia.: 25 3/4 in (654 mm)
- Wheelbase: 24 ft 9 in (7,544 mm)
  - Leading: 5 ft (1,524 mm)
  - Coupled: 11 ft (3,353 mm)
- Length
  - Over couplers: 32 ft 6 1/2 in (9,919 mm)
- Height: ♠ 12 ft 1/2 in (3,670 mm) ♥ 12 ft 2 1/2 in (3,721 mm)
- Frame type: Plate
- Axle load: ♠ 8 LT 9 cwt (8,586 kg) ♥ 9 LT 4 cwt (9,348 kg)
  - Leading: ♠ 7 LT 18 cwt (8,027 kg) ♥ 7 LT (7,112 kg)
  - 1st coupled: ♠ 8 LT 2 cwt (8,230 kg) ♥ 8 LT 9 cwt (8,586 kg)
  - 2nd coupled: ♠ 8 LT 9 cwt (8,586 kg) ♥ 9 LT 4 cwt (9,348 kg)
  - 3rd coupled: ♠ 8 LT 2 cwt (8,230 kg) ♥ 8 LT 14 cwt (8,840 kg)
  - 4th coupled: ♠ 8 LT 2 cwt (8,230 kg) ♥ 8 LT 17 cwt (8,992 kg)
  - Trailing: ♠ 6 LT 10 cwt (6,604 kg) ♥ 6 LT 8 cwt (6,503 kg)
- Adhesive weight: ♠ 32 LT 15 cwt (33,280 kg) ♥ 35 LT 4 cwt (35,760 kg)
- Loco weight: ♠ 47 LT 3 cwt (47,910 kg) ♥ 48 LT 12 cwt (49,380 kg)
- Fuel type: Coal
- Fuel capacity: ♠♥ 2 LT 5 cwt (2.3 t)
- Water cap.: ♠ 1,062 imp gal (4,830 L) ♥ 1,358 imp gal (6,170 L)
- Firebox
  - Type: ♠ Round-top ♥ Belpaire
  - Grate area: ♠ 15.7 sq ft (1.46 m^{2}) ♥ 23.5 sq ft (2.18 m^{2})
- Boiler
  - Pitch: ♠ 6 ft 7 1/2 in (2,019 mm) ♥ 7 ft (2,134 mm)
  - Diameter: ♠ 3 ft 11 in (1,194 mm) ♥ 3 ft 10 3/4 in (1,187 mm)
  - Tube plates: ♠♥ 10 ft 10 1/8 in (3,305 mm)
  - Small tubes: ♠ 178: 1 3/4 in (44 mm) ♥ 187: 1 3/4 in (44 mm)
- Boiler pressure: ♠ 140 psi (965 kPa) ♥ 160 psi (1,103 kPa)
- Safety valve: ♠ Salter & Ramsbottom ♥ Ramsbottom
- Heating surface
  - Firebox: ♠ 90.18 sq ft (8.378 m^{2}) ♥ 62 sq ft (5.8 m^{2})
  - Tubes: ♠ 888.20 sq ft (82.516 m^{2}) ♥ 929.5 sq ft (86.35 m^{2})
  - Total surface: ♠ 978.38 sq ft (90.894 m^{2}) ♥ 991.5 sq ft (92.11 m^{2})
- Cylinders: Two
- Cylinder size: 17 in (432 mm) bore 21 in (533 mm) stroke
- Valve gear: Stephenson
- Valve type: Slide
- Couplers: Johnston link-and-pin AAR knuckle (1930s)
Performance figures
- Tractive effort: ♠ 16,340 lbf (72.7 kN) @ 75% ♥ 18,660 lbf (83.0 kN) @ 75%
- Factor of adh.: 3.99
Career
- Operators: Natal Government Railways; South African Railways
- Class: ♠ NGR Class D1, SAR Class A ♥ NGR Class D2, SAR Class A Belpaire
- Number in class: 102
- Numbers: NGR 49–148; SAR 97–196, 332–333
- Delivered: 1888–1915
- First run: 1888
- Withdrawn: 1962
- Disposition: 5 preserved, remainder scrapped
- The leading coupled axle had flangeless wheels

The South African Railways Class A 4-8-2T of 1888 is a steam locomotive class from the pre-Union era in the Colony of Natal.

In 1888, the Natal Government Railways placed the first five of its eventual one hundred Class D 4-8-2T steam locomotives in service. The last was delivered in 1899. They were the first locomotives in the world to be built with a 4-8-2 wheel arrangement, later to become known as the Mountain type. In 1912, when these locomotives were assimilated into the South African Railways, they were renumbered and designated Class A. In 1915, another two Class A locomotives were built from spare parts.

== Manufacturers ==
The Natal Government Railways (NGR) Class D 4-8-2 tank locomotive was designed by William Milne, the Locomotive Superintendent of the NGR from 1877 to 1896, and was built by Dübs and Company. The first 46 locomotives, with an operating boiler pressure of 140 pounds per square inch (965 kilopascals) and numbered in the range from 49 to 94, were placed in service during Milne's term. They proved to be such good engines that, when G.W. Reid took over as Locomotive Superintendent in 1896, he continued to place further orders for another 58, numbered in the range from 91 to 148, but with the boiler pressure increased to 160 pounds per square inch (1,103 kilopascals). These 100 locomotives, initially known on the NGR as the Dübs A, were delivered in ten batches by Dübs between 1888 and 1899.

As far as is known, the Dübs A locomotives were the first in the world to be designed and built with a 4-8-2 wheel arrangement, later to become known as the Mountain type.

== Modifications ==
The performance in service of the Dübs A was gradually improved by various modifications. New boilers were fitted as and when the originals needed replacement, with a working pressure of 160 pounds per square inch (1,103 kilopascals) instead of the as-delivered 140 pounds per square inch (965 kilopascals) of the first few batches. This increased their tractive effort at 75% boiler pressure from 16,340 pounds-force (72.7 kilonewtons) to 18,670 pounds-force (83.0 kilonewtons). The coal bunkers were also enlarged and the connecting rod big-ends were changed to the marine type to increase ground clearance.

Another modification was an extended smokebox on most locomotives, such as on NGR no. 87 depicted below. In the 1890s, some improvements to smokebox design took place. Extending the smokebox forward increased its volume. The increased amount of exhaust gases present in the smokebox had the effect of stabilising and improving the draught. The date of this improvement can be pinned to 1891 when the second batch of Michael Stephens' Cape Government Railways (CGR) 5th Class 4-6-0 locomotives with their lengthened smokeboxes entered service. This had such a profound effect on the boiler's steaming ability that virtually every locomotive on the CGR and NGR had their smokeboxes extended.

Beginning in 1905, after D.A. Hendrie took over from Reid as Locomotive Superintendent, these locomotives were gradually fitted with Belpaire fireboxes with wider firegrates. The flat-topped Belpaire firebox had the advantage of an increased area of the water-line at the hottest part of the boiler, together with increased steam space over the firebox. In order to accomplish this, Hendrie raised the boiler's pitch by 4 1/2 inches (114 millimetres) and cut away the frame under the firebox to accommodate the wider grates. The wider firebox required that the water tanks also had to be moved out and the opportunity was taken to enlarge the tanks. The cabs were also improved to offer the engine crew better protection, and new brass-capped chimneys replaced the original straight flared chimneys. These modified locomotives were known as the Improved Dübs A.

When a locomotive classification system was introduced on the NGR, the Dübs A locomotive family was designated Class D. The unmodified locomotives became the Class D1 while the modified locomotives with Belpaire fireboxes became the Class D2.

== South African Railways ==
When the Union of South Africa was established on 31 May 1910, the three Colonial government railways (CGR, NGR and Central South African Railways) were united under a single administration to control and administer the railways, ports and harbours of the Union. Although the South African Railways and Harbours came into existence in 1910, the actual classification and renumbering of all the rolling stock of the three constituent railways was only implemented with effect from 1 January 1912.

In 1912, these engines were designated Class A and were renumbered in the range from 97 to 196, with the unmodified Class D1 locomotives receiving the numbers in the range from 97 to 186 and the ten, at the time, already reboilered Class D2 locomotives receiving the numbers in the range from 187 to 196. In South African Railways (SAR) service, the Improved Dübs A locomotives became known as the Class A Belpaire.

In 1915, to help counter wartime motive power shortages brought about by the diminished ability to order new locomotives from European builders due to hostilities, another two Class A locomotives were built from spare parts by the SAR in their Durban shops. These two locomotives were numbered 332 and 333.

== Service ==
In the NGR era, the Class D fleet remained in service on the Natal mainline until they were eventually displaced by more modern locomotives. They continued to serve well into the SAR era on the Dundee-Hlobane branchline, the Harrismith-Ladysmith section and on the north coast line to Empangeni.

In 1915, shortly after the outbreak of the First World War, the German South West Africa colony was occupied by the Union Defence Forces. Since a large part of the territory's railway infrastructure and rolling stock was destroyed or damaged by retreating German forces, an urgent need arose for locomotives for use on the Cape gauge lines in that territory. In 1917, numbers 98 and 183 were transferred to the Defence Department for service in South West Africa. Both locomotives are believed to have returned to South Africa after the war.

The last of the Class A was withdrawn from service in 1962. Several locomotives continued to serve in industrial use for many years.

== Preservation ==
Five members of the class survive in preservation.

- Ex NGR No. 84, SAR No. 130 named Patrys, is plinthed at the Reefsteamers Depot in Germiston.
- Ex NGR No. 90, SAR No. 136 named Umbilo, is in the care of the Umgeni Steam Railway.
- Ex NGR No. 55, SAR No. 103, was moved from Witbank to the Outeniqua Transport Museum in George in August 2014.
- Ex NGR No 133, SAR Class A Belpaire no. 196, was plinthed at Masons Mill in Pietermaritzburg until it was repatriated to the United Kingdom in 2011. It is now displayed at the entrance to the Mizens Railway near Woking.
- Ex NGR No. ?, SAR No. 176, on display at Brikor Limited, Olifantsfontein.

== Rebuilding to Class 17 4-8-0TT ==
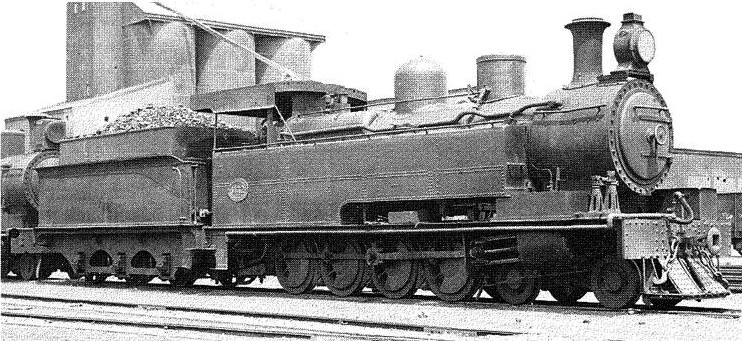
Class 17 4-8-0TT

When a shortage of suitable shunting locomotives developed in 1926, the SAR modified 21 Class A and Class A Belpaire 4-8-2T locomotives by removing the trailing bissel bogie and coal bunker, shortening the main frame and adding a tender to increase their coal and water capacity. Tenders from various scrapped locomotive types were used.

These 21 rebuilt locomotives became the SAR Class 17 4-8-0 tank-and-tender locomotives, numbered in the range from 1415 to 1435. They were used as shunting locomotives around Durban and Port Elizabeth, until they were withdrawn from service by 1961.

== Works numbers ==
The builder's works numbers, years built, NGR and SAR numbers, firebox type and Class 17 numbers are listed in the table.

Class A modification & renumbering & Class 17 4-8-0TT rebuilding
Builder	Works No.	Year	NGR No.	SAR No.	Model	Class 17 No.
Dübs	2446	1888	49	97	Dübs A	
Dübs	2447	1888	50	98	Dübs A	
Dübs	2448	1888	51	99	Dübs A	
Dübs	2449	1888	52	100	Dübs A	
Dübs	2450	1888	53	101	Dübs A	
Dübs	2451	1888	54	102	Dübs A	
Dübs	2499	1889	55	103	Dübs A	
Dübs	2500	1889	56	104	Dübs A	
Dübs	2501	1889	57	105	Dübs A	
Dübs	2502	1889	58	106	Dübs A	
Dübs	2503	1889	59	107	Dübs A	
Dübs	2504	1889	60	108	Dübs A	
Dübs	2604	1890	61	109	Dübs A	1421
Dübs	2605	1890	62	110	Dübs A	
Dübs	2606	1890	63	111	Dübs A	
Dübs	2607	1890	64	112	Dübs A	
Dübs	2608	1890	65	113	Dübs A	
Dübs	2609	1890	66	114	Dübs A	
Dübs	2610	1890	67	115	Dübs A	
Dübs	2611	1890	68	116	Dübs A	1417
Dübs	2612	1890	69	117	Dübs A	1427
Dübs	2613	1890	70	118	Dübs A	1428
Dübs	2614	1890	71	119	Dübs A	1425
Dübs	2615	1890	72	192	Belpaire	
Dübs	2616	1890	73	120	Dübs A	
Dübs	2617	1890	74	121	Dübs A	
Dübs	2618	1890	75	122	Dübs A	1420
Dübs	2619	1890	76	123	Dübs A	
Dübs	2620	1890	77	124	Dübs A	
Dübs	2621	1890	78	125	Dübs A	
Dübs	2622	1890	79	126	Dübs A	
Dübs	2623	1890	80	193	Belpaire	1423
Dübs	2624	1890	81	127	Dübs A	
Dübs	2625	1890	82	128	Dübs A	1419
Dübs	2626	1890	83	129	Dübs A	1433
Dübs	2627	1890	84	130	Dübs A	
Dübs	2628	1890	85	131	Dübs A	
Dübs	2965	1892	86	132	Dübs A	
Dübs	2966	1892	87	133	Dübs A	
Dübs	2967	1892	88	134	Dübs A	
Dübs	3317	1895	89	135	Dübs A	1422
Dübs	3318	1895	90	136	Dübs A	1426
Dübs	3319	1895	91	137	Dübs A	
Dübs	3320	1895	92	138	Dübs A	
Dübs	3321	1895	93	139	Dübs A	
Dübs	3322	1895	94	140	Dübs A	
Dübs	3363	1896	95	141	Dübs A	
Dübs	3364	1896	96	142	Dübs A	
Dübs	3365	1896	97	143	Dübs A	
Dübs	3366	1896	98	144	Dübs A	
Dübs	3367	1896	99	145	Dübs A	
Dübs	3368	1896	100	146	Dübs A	
Dübs	3477	1897	101	147	Dübs A	1434
Dübs	3478	1897	102	148	Dübs A	
Dübs	3479	1897	103	149	Dübs A	
Dübs	3480	1897	104	150	Dübs A	
Dübs	3481	1897	105	151	Dübs A	1431
Dübs	3482	1897	106	152	Dübs A	
Dübs	3483	1897	107	153	Dübs A	
Dübs	3484	1897	108	154	Dübs A	1416
Dübs	3485	1897	109	194	Belpaire	
Dübs	3486	1897	110	155	Dübs A	
Dübs	3604	1898	111	156	Dübs A	
Dübs	3605	1898	112	157	Dübs A	1432
Dübs	3556	1898	113	158	Dübs A	1415
Dübs	3557	1898	114	187	Belpaire	
Dübs	3558	1898	115	159	Dübs A	
Dübs	3559	1898	116	160	Dübs A	
Dübs	3560	1898	117	161	Dübs A	
Dübs	3561	1898	118	165	Dübs A	
Dübs	3562	1898	119	162	Dübs A	
Dübs	3563	1898	120	166	Dübs A	1424
Dübs	3564	1898	121	163	Dübs A	1435
Dübs	3565	1898	122	164	Dübs A	
Dübs	3566	1898	123	188	Belpaire	
Dübs	3567	1898	124	195	Belpaire	
Dübs	3811	1899	125	167	Dübs A	
Dübs	3812	1899	126	168	Dübs A	
Dübs	3813	1899	127	169	Dübs A	
Dübs	3814	1899	128	170	Dübs A	
Dübs	3815	1899	129	171	Dübs A	
Dübs	3816	1899	130	172	Dübs A	
Dübs	3817	1899	131	173	Dübs A	
Dübs	3818	1899	132	189	Belpaire	
Dübs	3819	1899	133	196	Belpaire	
Dübs	3820	1899	134	190	Belpaire	1418
Dübs	3821	1899	135	174	Dübs A	
Dübs	3822	1899	136	175	Dübs A	
Dübs	3823	1899	137	176	Dübs A	
Dübs	3824	1899	138	177	Dübs A	
Dübs	3825	1899	139	178	Dübs A	
Dübs	3826	1899	140	179	Dübs A	
Dübs	3827	1899	141	191	Belpaire	1430
Dübs	3828	1899	142	180	Dübs A	
Dübs	3829	1899	143	181	Dübs A	1429
Dübs	3830	1899	144	182	Dübs A	
Dübs	3831	1899	145	183	Dübs A	
Dübs	3832	1899	146	184	Dübs A	
Dübs	3833	1899	147	185	Dübs A	
Dübs	3834	1899	148	186	Dübs A	
SAR		1915		332	Belpaire	
SAR		1915		333	Belpaire	

== Illustration ==
The main picture shows SAR Class A Belpaire no. 196 at Masons Mill on 10 December 2010. Those following illustrate the short and long smokebox versions of the locomotive and some of the post-delivery changes which were made, such as the altered cab for better crew protection.

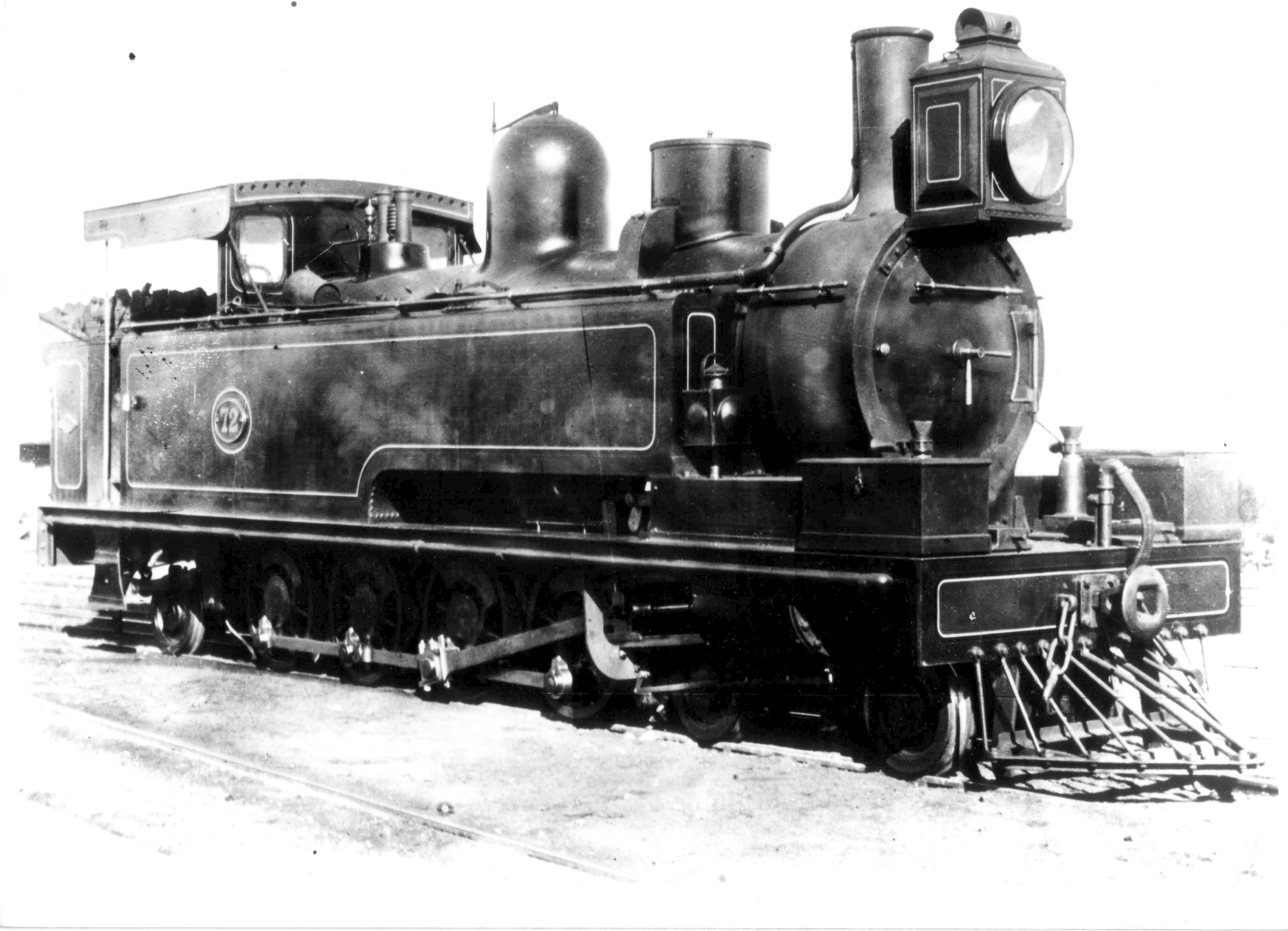
NGR Class D1 no. 72 with short smokebox, c. 1900

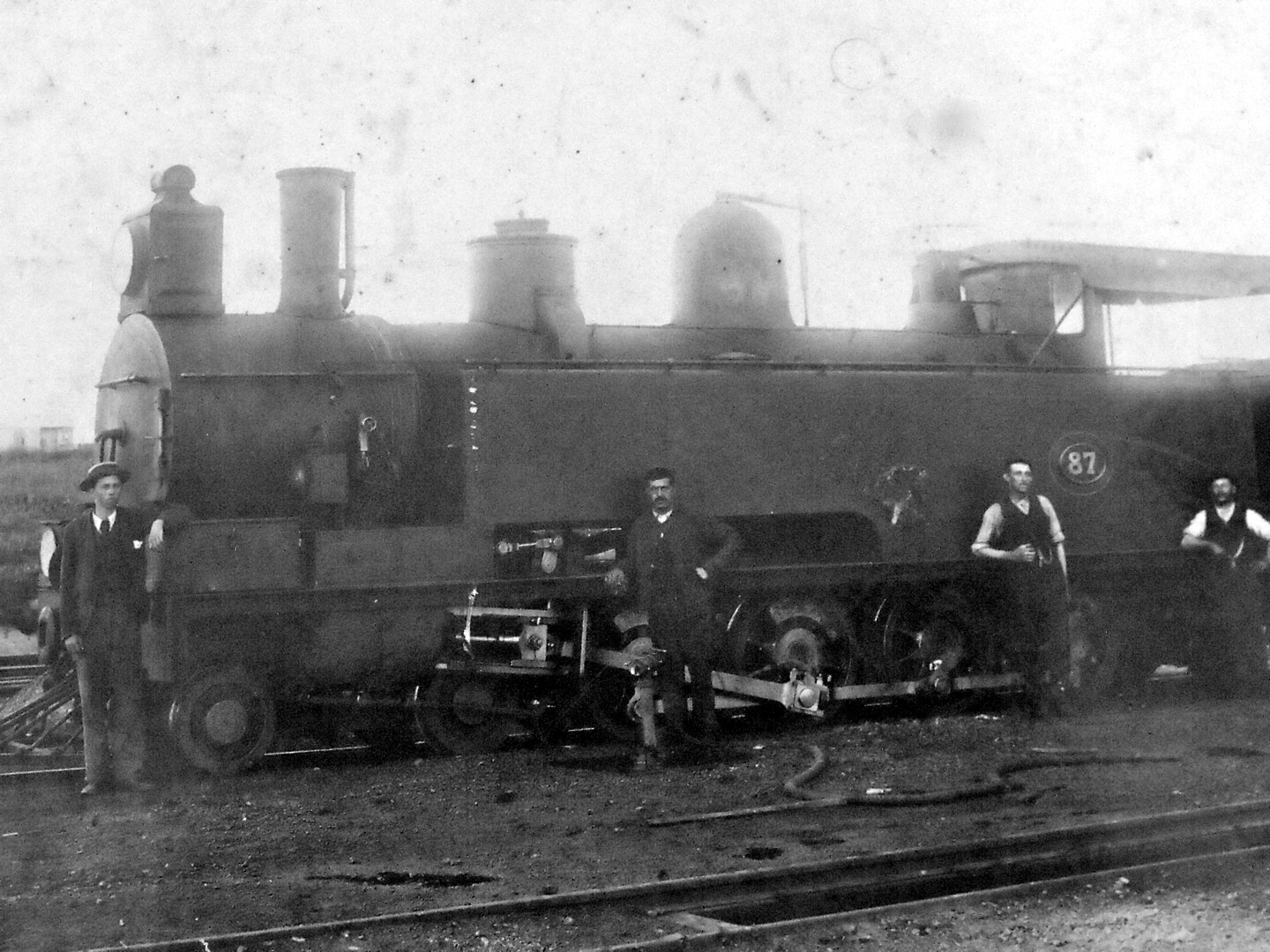
NGR Class D1 no. 87 with extended smokebox, c. 1898

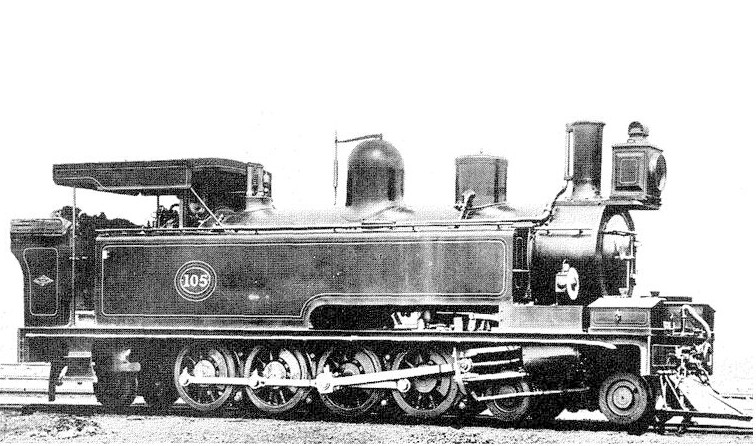
NGR Class D1 no. 105 with short smokebox, c. 1900

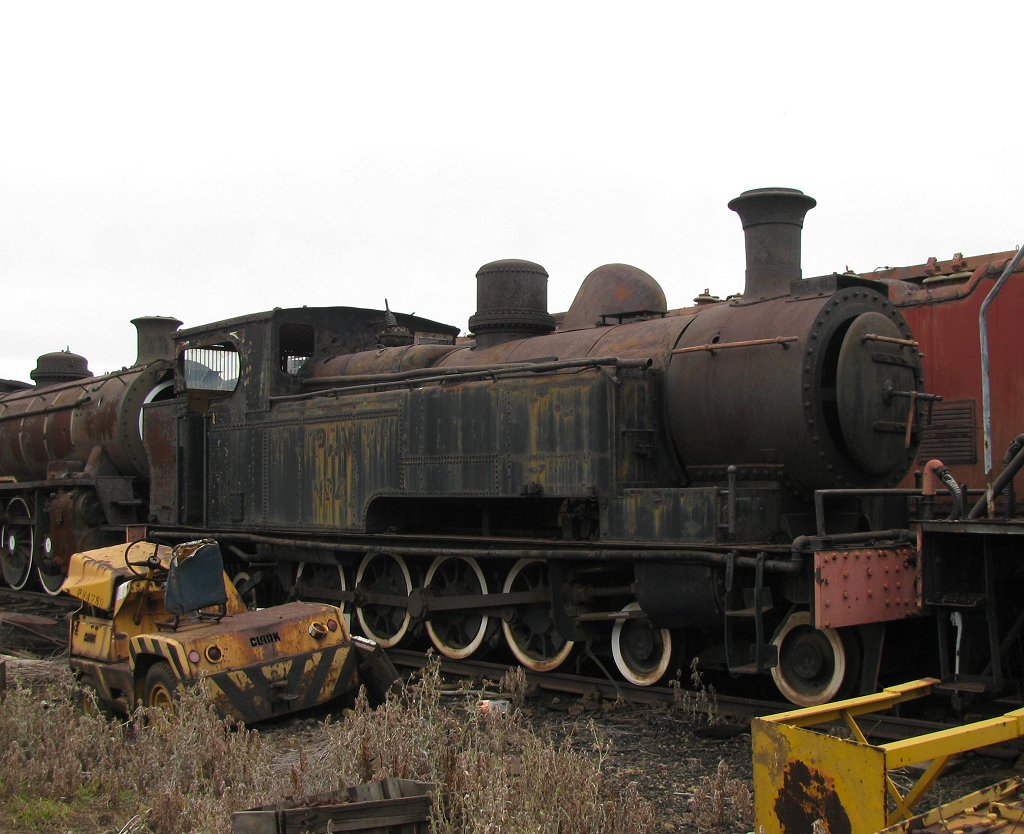
SAR Class A no. 103 with Belpaire firebox, 2010
