= 4-8-0 =

Locomotive wheel arrangement

4-8-0 (Twelve-wheeler)
- Front of locomotive at left

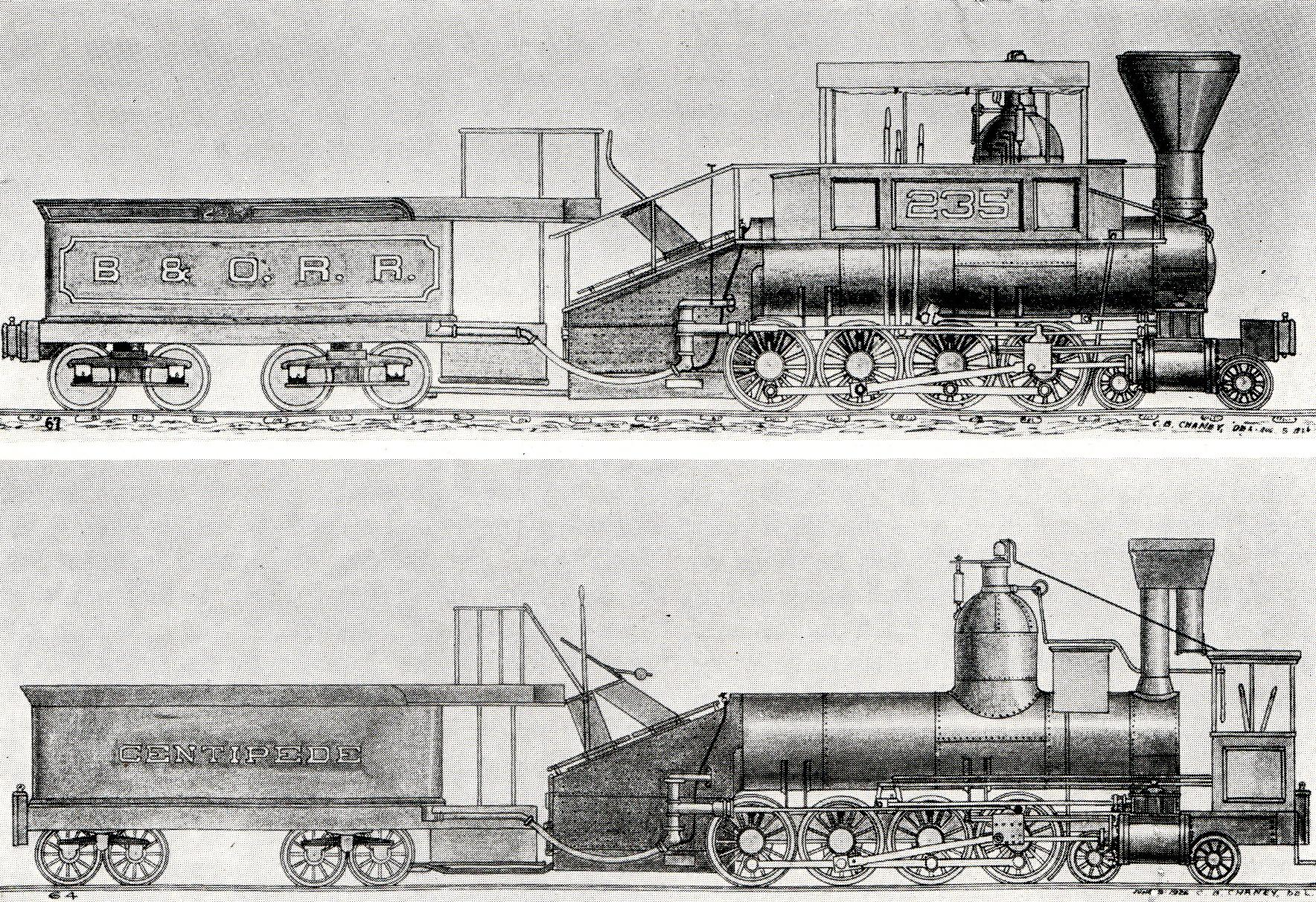
- The Centipede as built (bottom) and as modified by the B&O Railroad (top)
Equivalent classifications
- UIC class: 2′D
- French class: 240
- Turkish class: 46
- Swiss class: 4/6
- Russian class: 2-4-0
First known tank engine version
- First use: 1909
- Country: United Kingdom
- Locomotive: NER Class X
- Railway: North Eastern Railway
- Designer: Wilson Worsdell
- Builder: North Eastern Railway
First known tender engine version
- First use: 1855
- Country: United States of America
- Locomotive: B&O no. 235 ''Centipede''
- Railway: Baltimore and Ohio Railroad
- Designer: Ross Winans
- Builder: Ross Winans
First known "True type" version
- First use: 1882
- Country: United States
- Locomotive: 229 Mastodon
- Railway: Central Pacific Railroad
- Designer: Andrew Jackson Stevens
- Builder: Central Pacific Sacramento shops
- Evolved from: 2-8-0
- Evolved to: 4-8-2
- Benefits: Better power than 2-8-0
- Drawbacks: Small firebox

Under the Whyte notation for the classification of steam locomotives, 4-8-0 represents the wheel arrangement of four leading wheels on two axles, usually in a leading truck or bogie, eight powered and coupled driving wheels on four axles and no trailing wheels. In North America and in some other countries the type was usually known as the Twelve-wheeler.

== Overview ==
The first 4-8-0 locomotive is believed to have been the Centipede, a tender locomotive built by Ross Winans in 1855 for the Baltimore and Ohio Railroad in the United States of America, where it remained in service for nearly twenty years. It appears to have been delivered in a cab-forward type of configuration that was modified to a Camel configuration in 1864. On a Camel locomotive the cab was mounted atop the boiler, unlike the later Camelback locomotive whose cab straddled the boiler which first appeared around 1877.

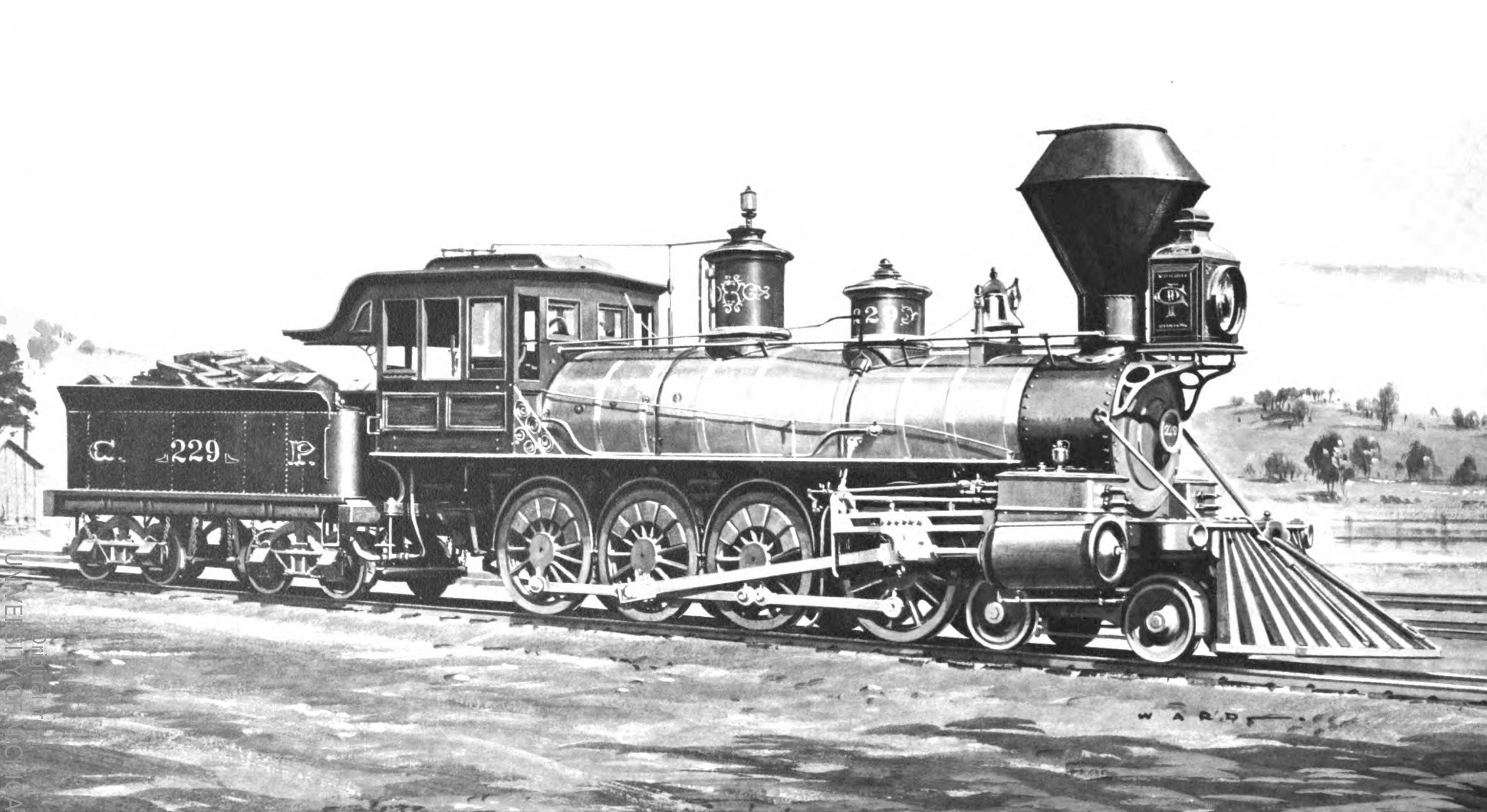
CPR no. 229, the Mastodon of 1882

The nickname Mastodon is often mistakenly used to describe the 4-8-0 wheel arrangement and was derived from the unofficial name of the first 4-8-0 locomotive of the Central Pacific Railroad in the United States, the wood-fired CPR no. 229, which was designed and built in 1882 by the railroad's master mechanic, Andrew Jackson (A.J.) Stevens, at the railroad's Sacramento works in California. However, several period publications instead use the nickname Mastodon to refer to the 4-10-0. These publications refer to the 4-8-0 as the Twelve-wheeler.

== Usage ==
=== Australia ===
The 4-8-0 wheel arrangement saw service in Australia from 1900. In Tasmania, the privately owned Emu Bay Railway ordered four 4-8-0 tender locomotives for their 3 ft 6 in (1,067 mm) gauge system. In 1911, another locomotive was delivered from the North British Locomotive Company. Two of these locomotives are preserved.

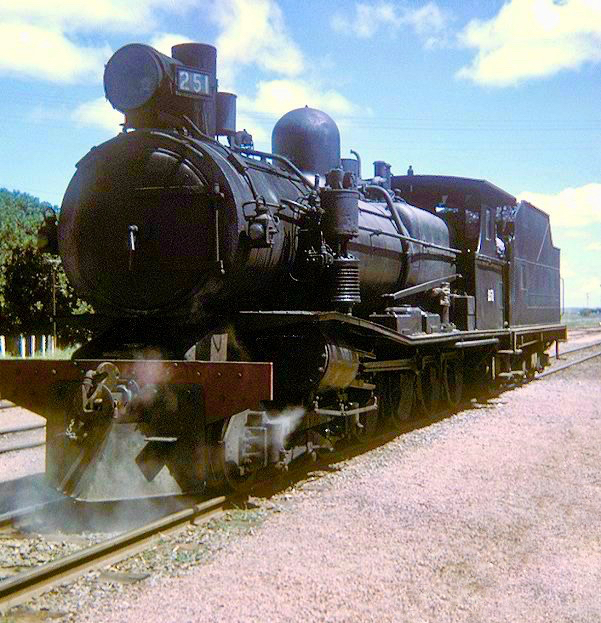
South Australian Railways T class

A new class of 4-8-0 locomotive, the T class, designed in South Australia for use on the narrow gauge 3 ft 6 in (1,067 mm) gauge system of the South Australian Railways, was introduced in 1903. It proved to be a suitable workhorse and by 1917 there were 78 locomotives in the class. In 1921 and 1922, the Tasmanian Government also purchased six of these narrow gauge South Australian locomotives and, during 1922 and 1923, five of the class were converted to 1,600 mm (5 ft 3 in) gauge for use on the broad gauge system of the South Australian. These were converted back to narrow gauge in 1949. During the Second World War, the Commonwealth Railways obtained four of these South Australian narrow gauge locomotives on loan. Several of these locomotives are preserved.

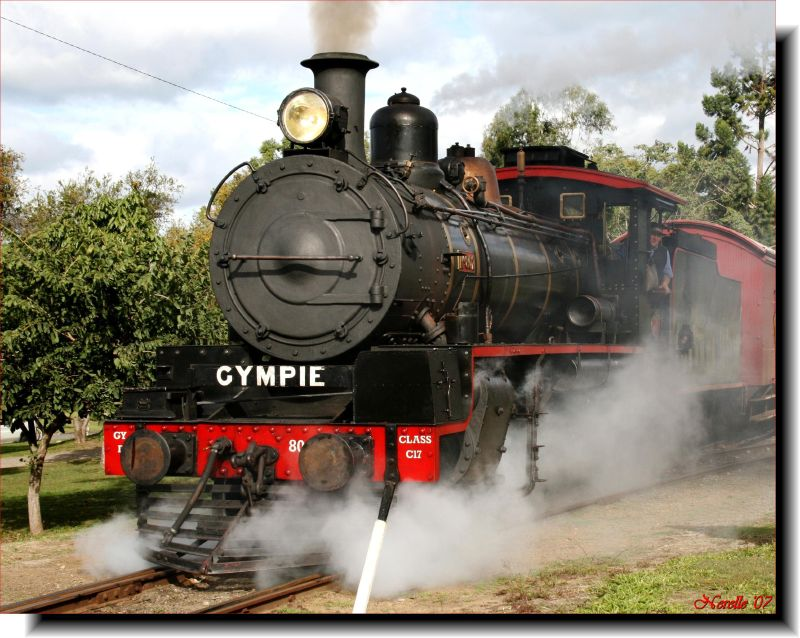
QGR C17 class

The Queensland Government Railways (QGR) introduced its C16 class of 4-8-0 locomotives in 1903, built at its Ipswich workshops. Altogether 152 of these locomotives were in service by 1917. Beginning in 1920, a number of the QGR C16 class locomotives were equipped with superheaters on an experimental basis, but since their slide valves were not suited to superheated steam and became prone to steam leaks due to excessive wear, they were soon converted back to use saturated steam. During the Second World War, the Commonwealth Government also acquired eleven C16 class locomotives on loan. Only one example of this class was preserved.

The QGR's superheated C17 class entered service from 1920. The Commonwealth Railways also ordered 22 locomotives of the same design for their narrow gauge rail system, designated the NM class. In total, the C17 class eventually numbered 227 locomotives, of which twenty are preserved.

In 1922, the QGR ordered 22 new 4-8-0 locomotives and designated them the C19 class. They were the largest conventional-type locomotives to operate on the QGR.

=== Austria ===
In Austria, the 4-8-0 wheel arrangement was used for express locomotives. The Class 570 locomotive was introduced in 1915 and the class 113 locomotive of the Austrian Federal Railways was introduced in 1923. From 1938, both classes were re-designated as Class 33 on the Deutsche Reichsbahn.

=== Bechuanaland ===
In 1897, four Cape 7th Class 4-8-0 locomotives were ordered by the Cape Government Railways (CGR) from Neilson and Company for use on the new Vryburg to Bulawayo line of the fledgling Bechuanaland Railway Company (BR). The line through Bechuanaland Protectorate was still under construction and was operated by the CGR on behalf of the BR at the time. The locomotives were eventually returned to the CGR and were designated Class 7A on the South African Railways in 1912.

=== France ===
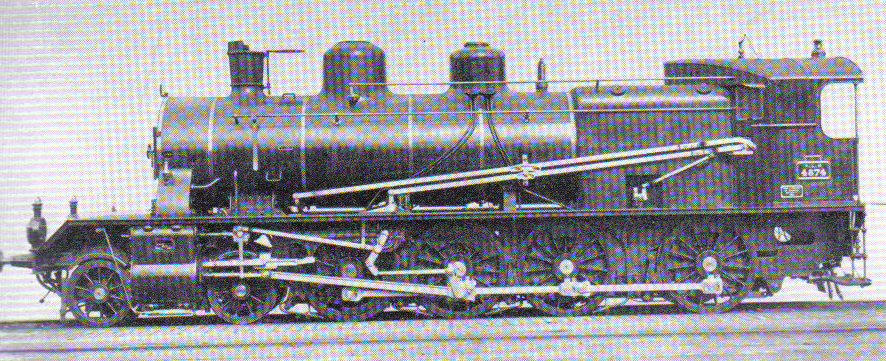
PLM 4-8-0, without its tender

In France, the 4-8-0 wheel arrangement was used on two locomotive classes. The first was in 1907 by the Chemins de fer de Paris à Lyon et à la Méditerranée (PLM). These locomotives were intended for goods trains, as well as passenger trains on the more difficult routes. They were Baudry type compound locomotives, similar to the De Glehn type, but with their low pressure cylinders set at 60% cut-off. All of them originally used saturated steam, but some were later equipped with superheaters while all the others were provided with feedwater heaters. These locomotives had a maximum speed limit of 52.8 miles per hour (85 kilometres per hour) and were designed to be able to haul 1,177 long tons (1,196 t; 1,318 short tons) at 22.4 miles per hour (36 kilometres per hour). A total of 282 were built. The PLM had prepared designs for another much larger 4-8-0 locomotive by 1913, but it did not materialise as a result of the outbreak of the First World War.

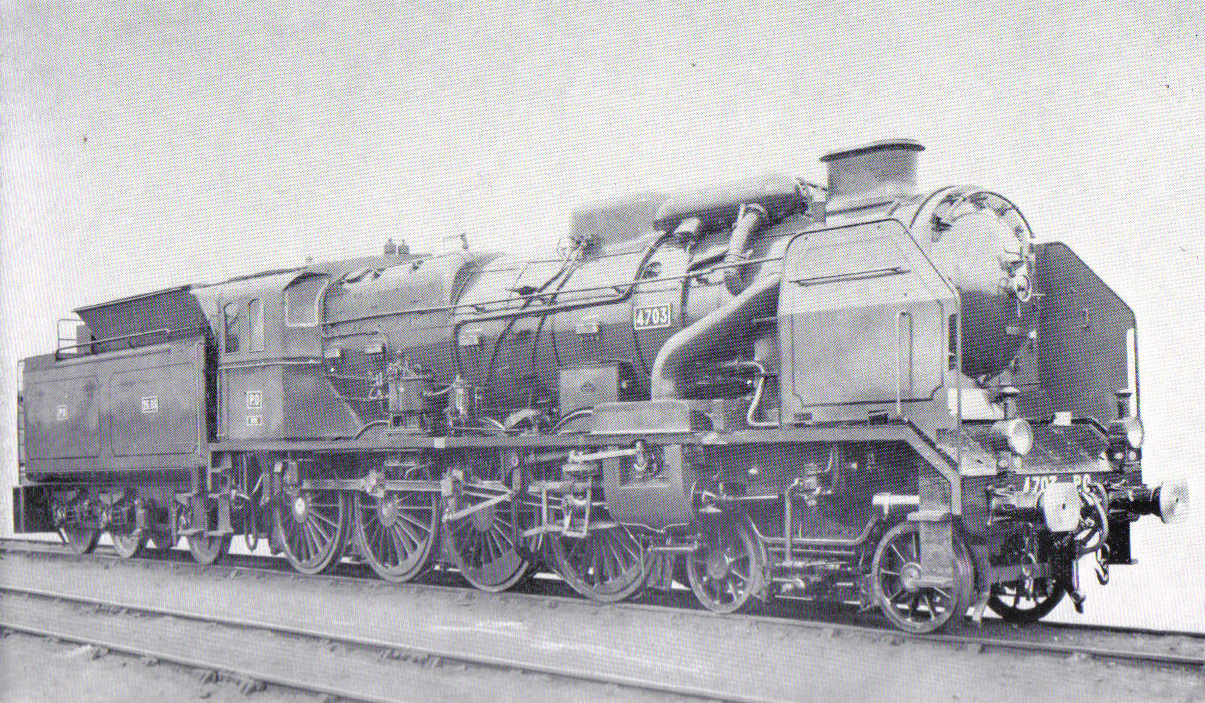
Early 240P class 4-8-0

The second 4-8-0 locomotive to appear in France was the famous 240P class of the Société Nationale des Chemins de Fer Français (SNCF), with "240" in this instance referring to the French classification of wheel arrangement according to the number and arrangement of axles rather than wheels. Technically, these locomotives were developments of some of the earliest 4-6-2 Pacific locomotives in Europe that were built for the Chemin de Fer de Paris à Orléans (PO). The 240P class was considered to be one of André Chapelon's finest designs and benefited from his thorough understanding of thermodynamics and his appreciation of the need to consider the entirety of the steam circuit. The locomotive was a four-cylinder compound, fitted with Lentz-Dabeg poppet valves.

Coupled with an elegant French style tender, the second batch of the 240P class was aesthetically much more pleasing. With a power output of 4,700 horsepower (3,500 kilowatts), the 240P class was reputed to have the highest power-to-weight ratio of any steam locomotive. Discussion continues as to how robust they were mechanically, for example whether the size of the bearings was too near the bone, or whether they were simply worked to death during the difficult war years. None have survived in preservation.

=== Hungary ===
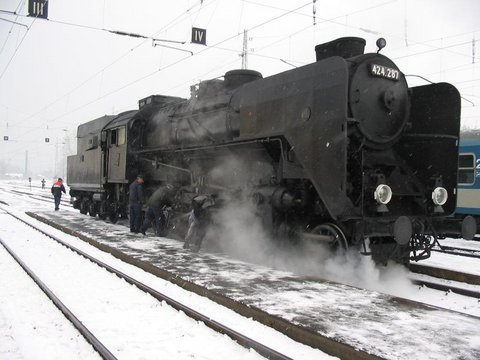
MÁV Class 424

In the 1920s, the Magyar Államvasutak (Hungarian State Railways or MÁV) adopted the 4-8-0 type as their standard mixed-traffic locomotive in the shape of the 424 class, which was built between 1924 and 1958. Of these, 365 were built for Hungary and 149 for foreign systems, including the Yugoslav Railways, the Soviet Union and North Korea. In Yugoslavia, they were designated the Jugoslovenske Železnice (JŽ) class 11. The last of the Hungarian locomotives were withdrawn from service in 1984.

=== Ireland ===
For a short period, the Great Southern and Western Railway in Ireland and its successor, the Great Southern Railways, operated two inside-cylinder 4-8-0T shunting locomotives. Intended for shunting at Dublin Kingsbridge (now Heuston) and for banking on the steep gradient out of Cork Glanmire Road (now Kent), the first locomotive emerged from the company's Inchicore workshops in 1915 and the second in 1924. They proved unsuccessful, being expensive to operate and unsuitable for sharp curves, and were withdrawn in 1928 and 1931 respectively.

On the Irish three-foot gauge, the Londonderry and Lough Swilly Railway operated two 4-8-0 tender locomotives. Built by Hudswell Clarke, they were introduced in 1905 and withdrawn in the 1930s and 1940s. The two were the only tender locomotives ever to operate on that gauge in Ireland and, with two subsequent 4-8-4 tank engines from the same manufacturer, were considered to be the most powerful which ever worked on any Irish narrow-gauge railway.

=== Mexico ===
4-8-0 locomotives in Mexico were almost entirely built in the United States. The first locomotives were provided by the Southern Pacific Railroad to independent and subsidiary railroads such as the Cananae, Rio Yaqui & Pacifico and Sud Pacifico de Mexico. The Sud Pacifico de Mexico used, in total, 14 of the Southern Pacific's 4-8-0s, including a few from CRY&P, all constructed at Schenectady between 1889 and 1895.

The National Railways of Mexico had four classes of 4-8-0. The first two orders were relatively small locomotives from Brooks in 1897. In 1924, a much larger locomotive was ordered, the PR-7, numbers 5-A to 2856 and weighing 127 tons. Unusually among American-built 4-8-0s, these were intended for express passenger service and therefore had much larger drivers than 4-8-0s operating in the United States, at 67 inches diameter. The cylinders had an unusually square bore and stroke of 28 x 28 inches. Because the firebox was wide and above the frames, the tops of the last set of drivers projected into the firebox, something which was only possible due to them being oil fired.

In 1935, a further five locomotives were built with larger boilers, which increased the evaporative heating surface by 357 square feet and the superheater surface by 172 square feet. These were designated PR-8, numbers 3000 to 3004. At 144 tons, the PR-8 was the heaviest conventional 4-8-0 ever built. The Norfolk & Western's M2, which is often credited as being the heaviest conventional 4-8-0, weighed 8,470 pounds (3,842 kilograms) less than the PR-8.

=== New Zealand ===
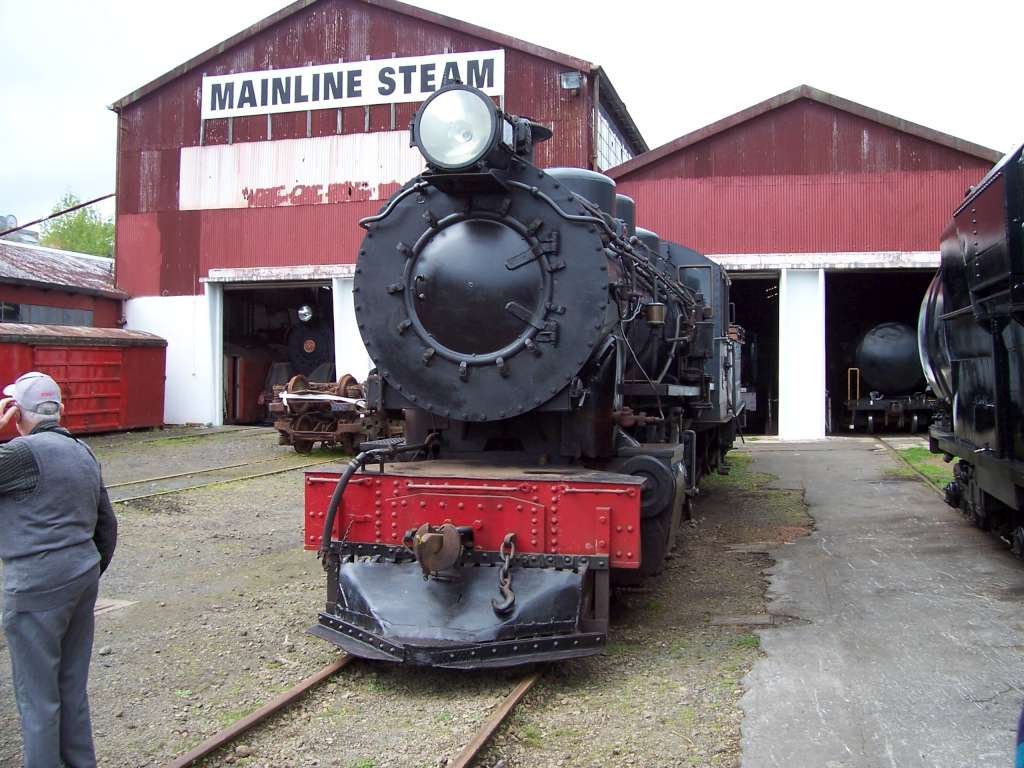
NZR B^{A} class no. 552

New Zealand's first 4-8-0 locomotive was built in the Addington Railway Workshops of the New Zealand Railways Department (NZR) in 1899 and designated B class. Four more were completed that same year and one more in 1901, while Sharp, Stewart & Company built four more over the next two years.

Ten B^{A} class locomotives were built by the NZR at its Addington shops between 1911 and 1913, and thirty B^{B} class locomotives were built by A&G Price in New Zealand between 1915 and 1918. One each of the B^{A} class and B^{B} class have been preserved, B^{A} no. 552 and B^{B} no. 144. Both are in Auckland at the Parnell Depot of Mainline Steam, an organisation devoted to the restoration and operation of historic New Zealand Railways mainline steam locomotives.

=== Poland ===
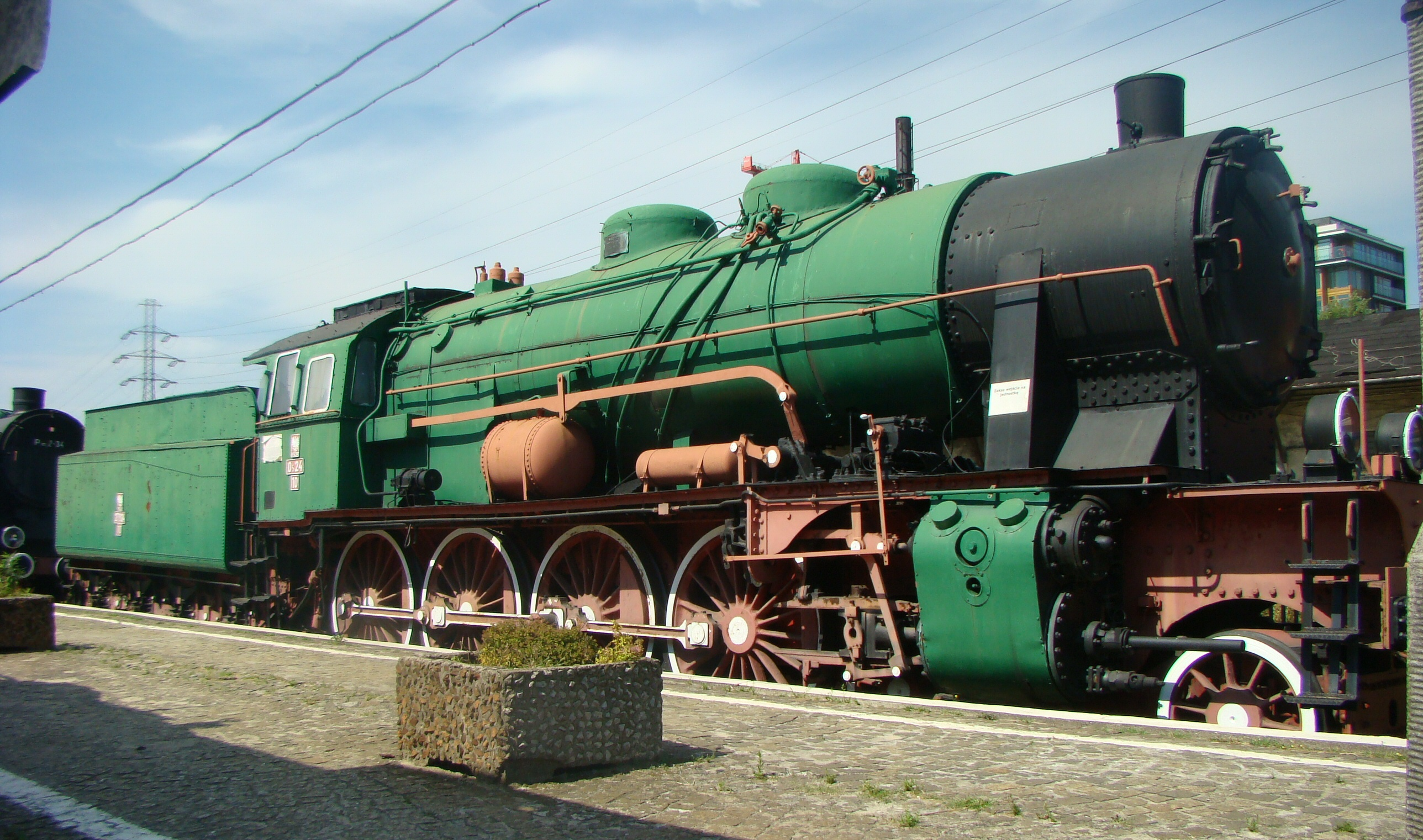
Os24-10 in Stacja Muzeum in Warsaw

The only 4-8-0 locomotives in polish service, were Os24. They were based on Austrian Class 570 and built in years 1925 - 1927. Their first purpose was operating express services in central and eastern Poland. Os24 turned out to be unreliable locomotives, which resulted in reduction of ordered units. Among their major issues, machines had problems with snaking, stability installation malfunctions and even with breaking wheels and frames. 60 built locomotives were located in eastern depots, like Lublin, Wilno, Białystok, etc. (situation in late 1938). It caused that majority of locomotives during WWII have been captured by USSR. After 1945 only 15 units returned to Poland. Their service ended in until 1970. Today the only surviving Os24 is stored in Stacja Muzeum in Warsaw. Locomotive was built in 1926 in Fablok.

=== Rhodesia ===
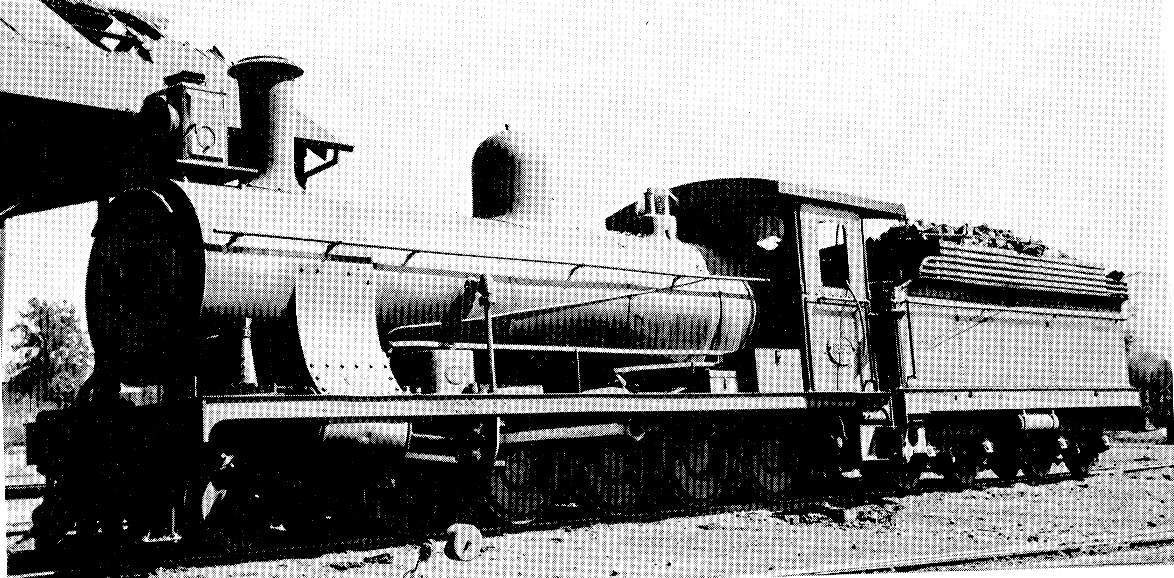
Rhodesia Railways 7th Class

Between 1899 and 1903, 52 Cape 7th Class 4-8-0 locomotives were built for the Beira and Mashonaland and Rhodesia Railways (BMR) that later became a constituent part of the Rhodesia Railways (RR). These locomotives were acquired by Southern Rhodesia at the time when railways were still expanding from the Cape Colony via Bechuanaland Protectorate into Southern Rhodesia in the southwest, from Beira in Mozambique to Umtali in the east, and while the Second Boer War was still in progress. At the time, the system was composed of four smaller railways, all of them still largely under construction, that were eventually all linked up in 1902. These were the fledgling Bechuanaland Railways (BR), the Mashonaland Railways (MR), the Rhodesia Railways Northern Extensions (RRM) and the BMR. The locomotives were ordered in five batches from three British manufacturers, 24 from Neilson, Reid and Company in 1899 and 1900, eight from Kitson and Company between 1901 and 1903, and twenty from North British Locomotive Company in 1903. In 1915, five of the Neilson, Reid locomotives were sold to the South African Railways, where they were designated Class 7D.

=== South Africa ===
All Mastodon locomotives that saw service in South Africa were built for 3 ft 6 in (1,067 mm) Cape gauge.

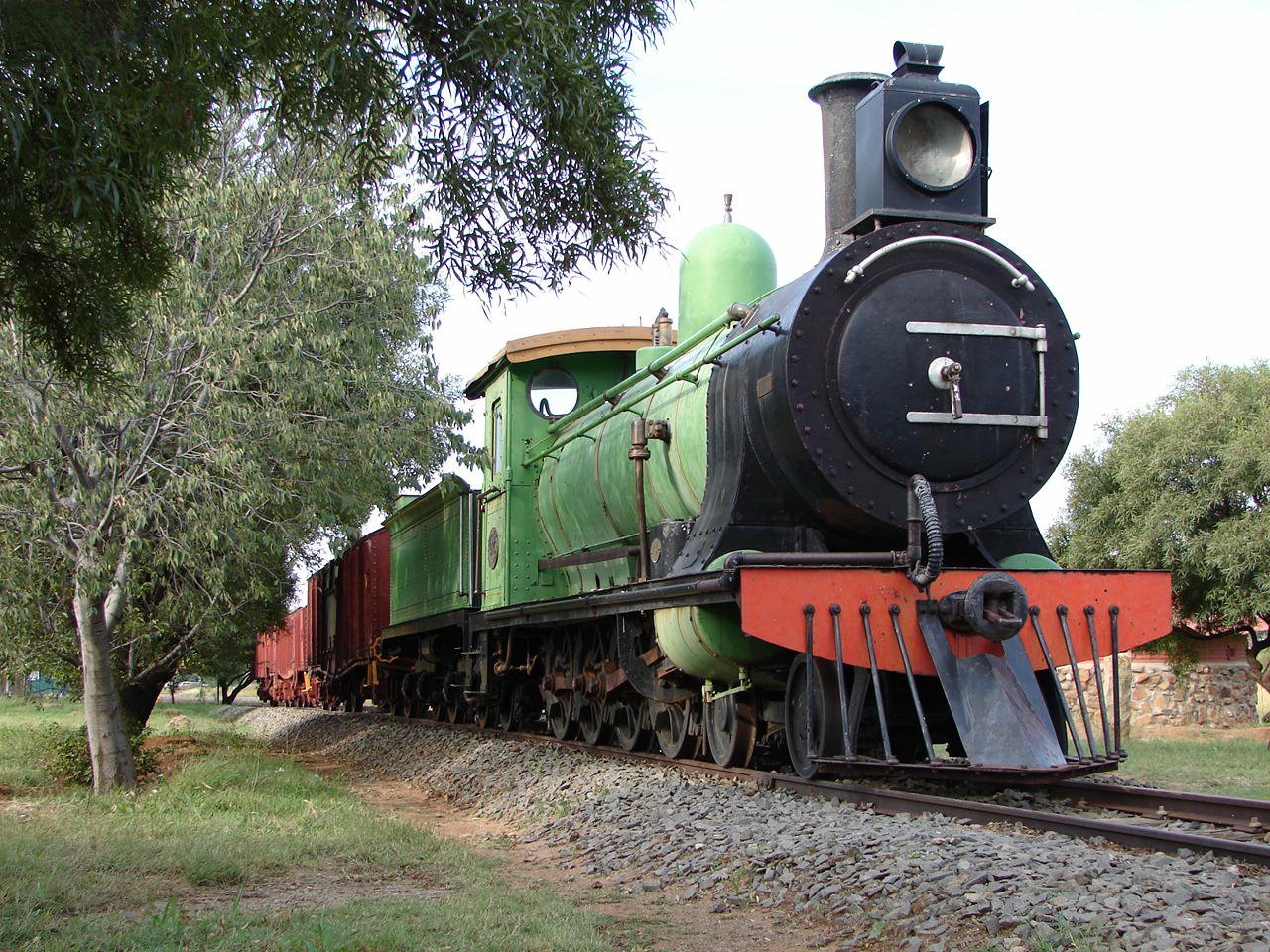
CGR 7th Class, SAR Class 7

Following a decision by the Cape Government Railways (CGR) to acquire eight-coupled goods locomotives, a complete design for such a locomotive was prepared at the Salt River works in Cape Town under the supervision of Locomotive Superintendent H.M. Beatty. This became the Cape 7th Class 4-8-0, the legendary locomotive that played a part in the construction of a large part of the railways into the interior of Africa south of the equator.

- In 1892 and 1893, 38 of these 7th Class locomotives were delivered from Dübs and Company and Neilson and Company. In 1912 they were designated Class 7 when they were assimilated into the South African Railways (SAR).
- Between 1896 and 1901, a second batch of 46 7th Class locomotives entered service on the CGR. These had increased heating capacity. Built by Sharp, Stewart and Company, Dübs and Neilson, they were designated Class 7A on the SAR in 1912.
- Between 1899 and 1903, the Beira and Mashonaland and Rhodesia Railways (BMR) in Southern Rhodesia placed 52 Cape 7th Class locomotives in service. In May 1915, five of these locomotives, all built by Neilson, Reid and Company, were sold to the SAR who designated them Class 7D.
- Between 1899 and 1904, the New Cape Central Railway (NCCR) placed seven Cape 7th Class locomotives in service on its 211-mile-long (340-kilometre) line from Worcester to Mosselbaai in the Cape Colony, built by Neilson, Reid and North British Locomotive Company (NBL). In 1925, when the NCCR was amalgamated into the SAR, these seven locomotives were designated Class 7E.

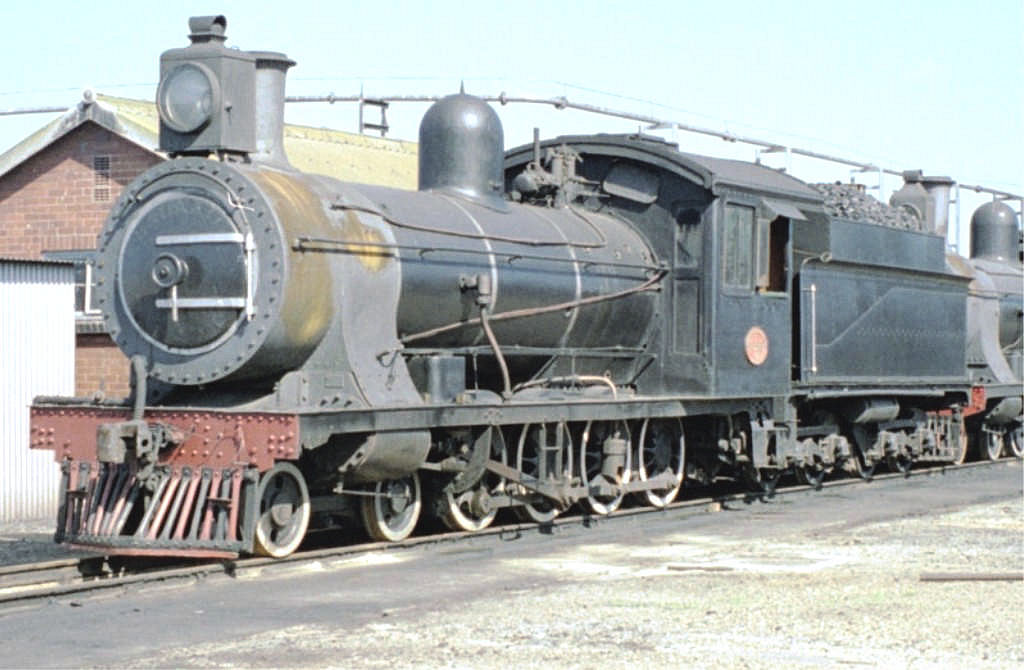
IMR 7th Class, SAR Class 7B

- In 1900, the Imperial Military Railways (IMR) placed 25 Cape 7th Class locomotives in service, as well as three more that had been ordered by the Pretoria-Pietersburg Railway, all built by Neilson, Reid. They all came onto the Central South African Railways (CSAR) roster at the end of the Second Boer War in 1902. In 1912, they were designated Class 7B on the SAR.
- In 1902, the CGR placed its last ten 7th Class locomotives in service. They were built by Neilson, Reid and had larger diameter boilers with a higher boiler pressure rating and larger cylinders. In 1912 they were designated Class 7C on the SAR.
- In 1913, the NCCR placed three Class 7 locomotives in service, built by NBL. They were more powerful than earlier models and also different in appearance, without the distinctive covered smokebox saddle and with running boards that dipped down ahead of the smokebox and beneath the cab. In 1925, these three locomotives were designated Class 7F on the SAR.

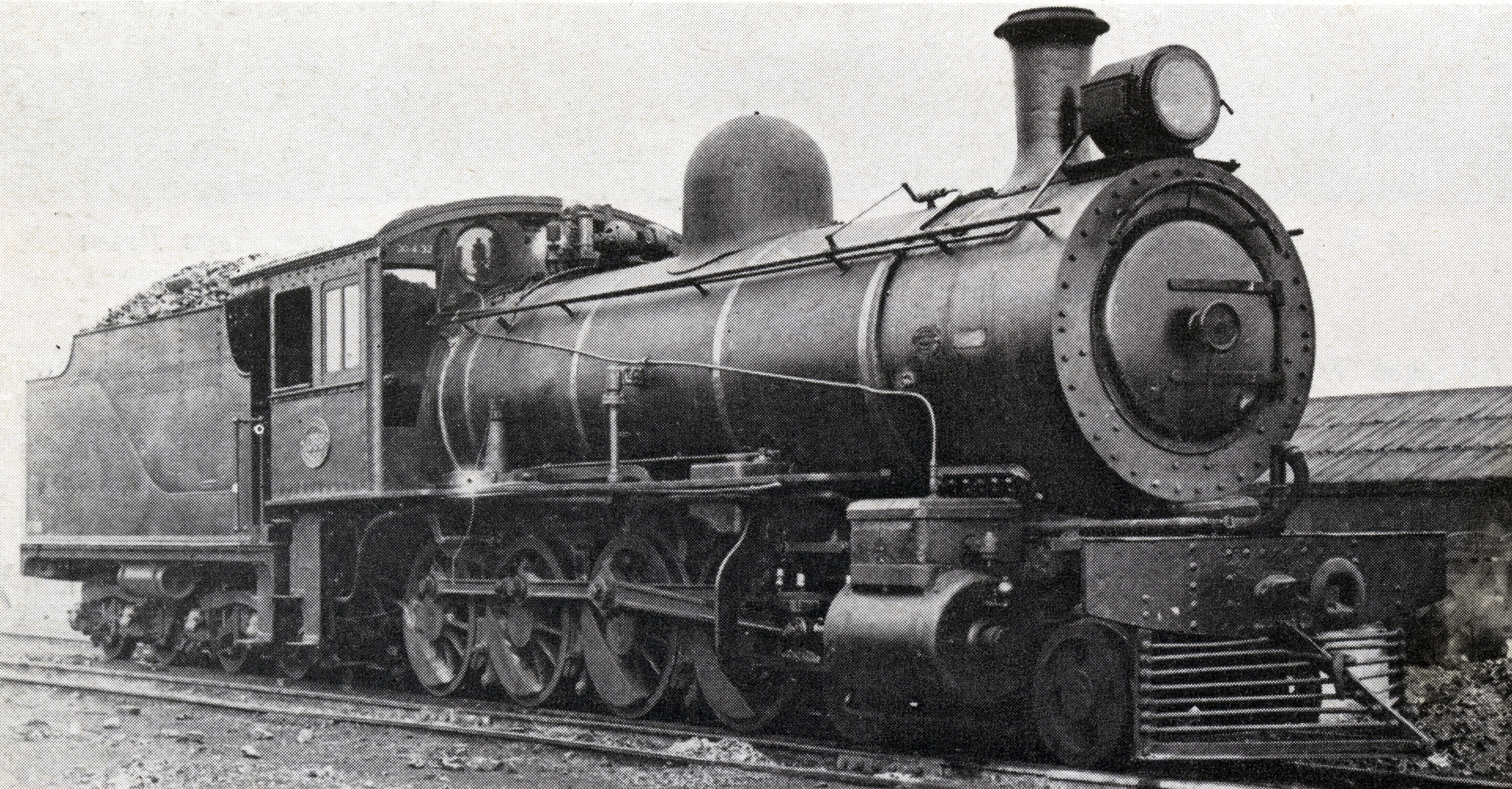
CGR 8th Class, SAR Class 8

In 1902 and 1903, the CGR and CSAR placed a number of Cape 8th Class 4-8-0 locomotives in service. Initially designed in 1901 as a 2-8-0 Consolidation by H.M. Beatty, some trouble had been experienced with the leading pony trucks of the first locomotives and it was dropped in favour of a four-wheeled bogie in later orders for more locomotives.

- Altogether 23 8th Class locomotives entered service on the CGR in 1902 and 1903, built by Neilson, Reid. They had larger coupled wheels than the 7th Class, bar frames, used saturated steam and had Stephenson valve gear. In service it was found that the four wheeled bogies and the slightly shorter fixed wheelbase made them steadier and easier riding than their 2-8-0 predecessors. In 1912, they were designated Class 8 on the SAR.
- In 1902, forty Cape 8th Class locomotives that had been ordered by the IMR a year earlier, were delivered to the CSAR from Neilson, Reid and Sharp, Stewart. They were designated Class 8-L1 on the CSAR and in 1912 they became Class 8A on the SAR.

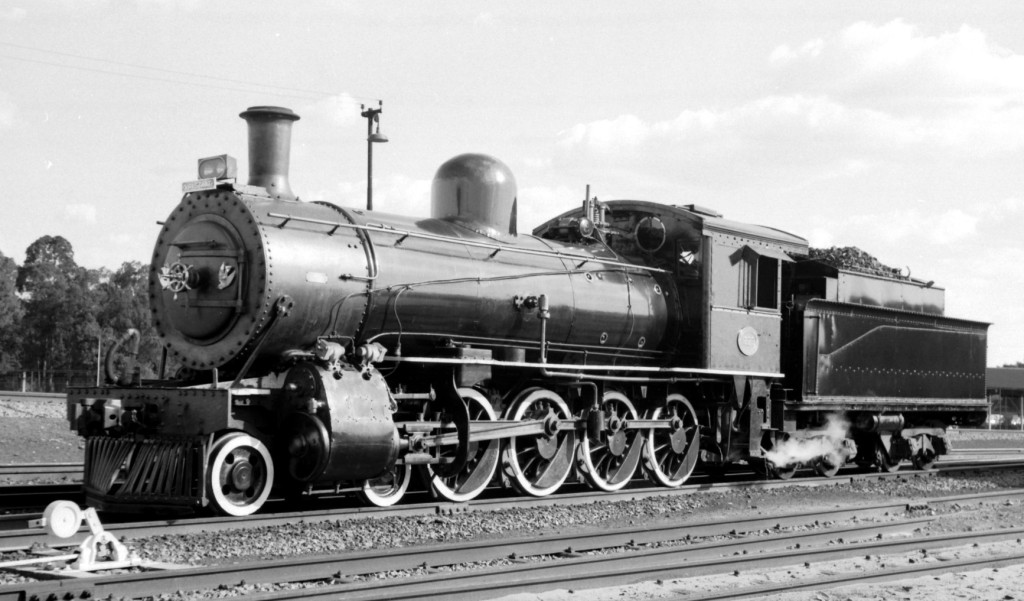
SAR Class 8D

- In 1903, when the first batch of 8th Class 4-8-0 locomotives had been tried and proven successful, the CGR placed 38 more in service, delivered in four batches from Neilson, Reid and NBL. In 1912 they became Class 8D on the SAR.
- At the same time, the CGR ordered four additional locomotives of the 8th class. It was an experimental design built to modified specifications in order to accommodate a grate area that was increased from 21 to 27.5 square feet (2.0 to 2.6 square metres). They were also built by Neilson, Reid in 1903 and, in 1912, they were reclassified to Class 8E by the SAR.
- In 1903, the CSAR also placed thirty Class 8-L2 locomotives in service, built by Neilson, Reid and NBL to the specifications of the Cape 8th class, but equipped with Drummond firebox tubes. In 1912, they were designated Class 8B on the SAR.
- Also in 1903, the CSAR acquired a second batch of thirty Class 8-L3 locomotives, built by NBL. They differed from the previous thirty only by not being equipped with Drummond water tubes and were the last locomotives to be ordered by the CSAR that were built to the design of another railway. In 1912 they were reclassified to Class 8C on the SAR.
- In 1904, the CGR received its final batch of ten 8th Class locomotives from NBL. In 1912 they became Class 8F on the SAR.
- In 1930, SAR Class 8X no. 883, a 2-8-0 Consolidation that had been built by the American Locomotive Company (ALCO) for the CGR in 1902, was reboilered by the SAR with a purpose-built boiler. At the same time, it was superheated, converted to a 4-8-0 Mastodon wheel arrangement by replacing the leading pony truck with a bogie, and reclassified to the sole Class 8R.

Because of the limited coal and water range of the existing fleet of Natal Government Railways (NGR) tank locomotives, Locomotive Superintendent D.A. Hendrie was tasked to produce a locomotive of greater power and capable of longer distances without refuelling or rewatering, to work the main line's steep 1 in 30 gradients. The result was the NGR Class B, the first NGR tender locomotive to be built in quantity.

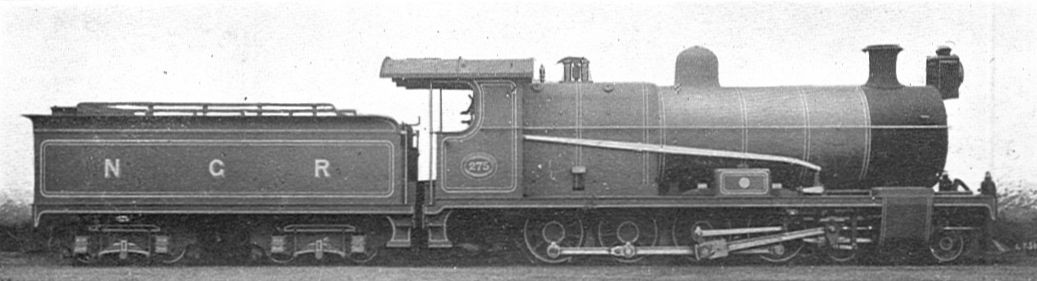
NGR Class Hendrie B, SAR Class 1

- Fifty Class B 4-8-0 locomotives were delivered from NBL in 1904, the first tender locomotive fleet to be placed in service by the NGR. They had plate frames, Walschaert valve gear with Murdoch's D slide valves, Belpaire fireboxes and used saturated steam. Six of them were modified to a 4-8-2 Mountain wheel arrangement in 1906 and, in 1912, the remaining 44 were designated Class 1 on the SAR.
- In 1910, the NGR placed 21 Improved Class B locomotives in service. They were built by NBL and incorporated various improvements to the original design of the Class B. Their boilers had been raised by 1 1/4 inches (32 millimetres) to give a better rake on the sides of the ash pan and they were built with Hendrie's steam reversers. In 1912, they were designated Class 1A on the SAR.

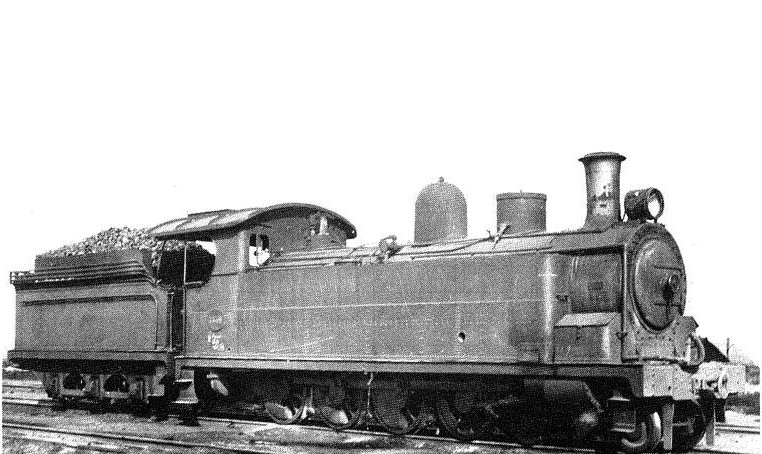
SAR Class 13, c. 1912

At the end of the Second Boer War, the CSAR inherited 35 4-10-2T Reid Tenwheeler tank locomotives from the IMR and designated them Class E. The CSAR found them to have an inadequate coal and water supply for trips of any length and, beginning in 1905, 29 of them were converted to 4-8-0 tank-and-tender locomotives by removing the trailing bissel bogie, the fifth pair of driving wheels and the coal bunker, shortening the main frame and adding tenders reclaimed from various scrapped locomotives. In 1912, these locomotives were reclassified as Class 13 on the SAR.

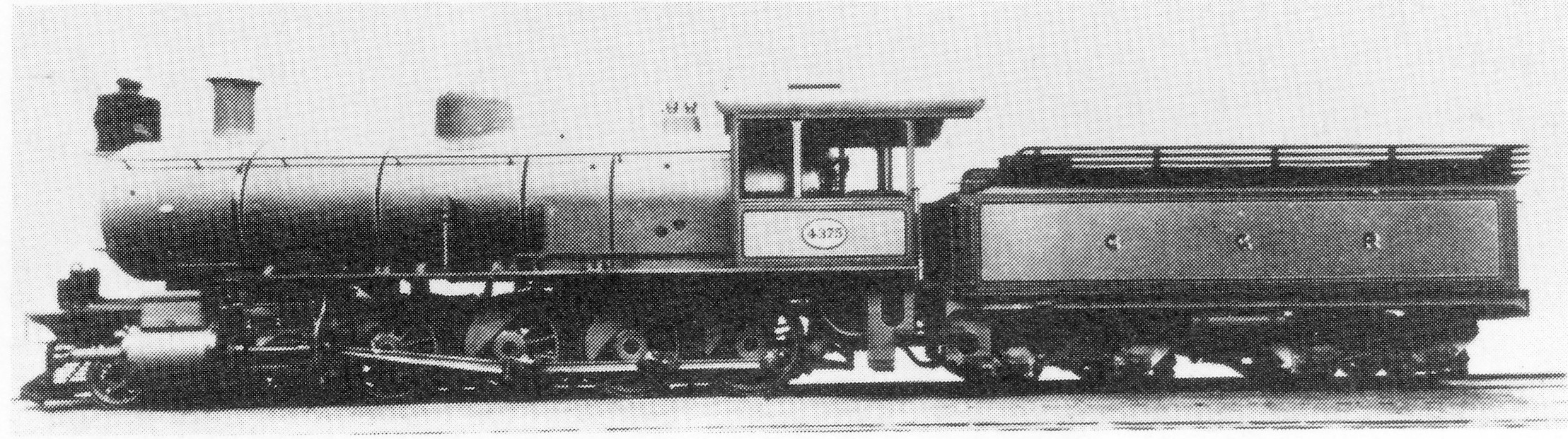
CGR Class 10, SAR Class Experimental 6

In 1906, the CGR placed a single experimental 10th Class 4-8-0 locomotive in service on the Cape Eastern System. Designed by H.M. Beatty and built by Kitson and Company, it was in most respects a larger and more powerful version of Beatty's last Cape 8th Class of 1904, the Class 8F on the SAR. Despite its good performance, the design was never repeated since some trouble was experienced with the firebox. In 1912, it was designated Class Experimental 6 on the SAR.

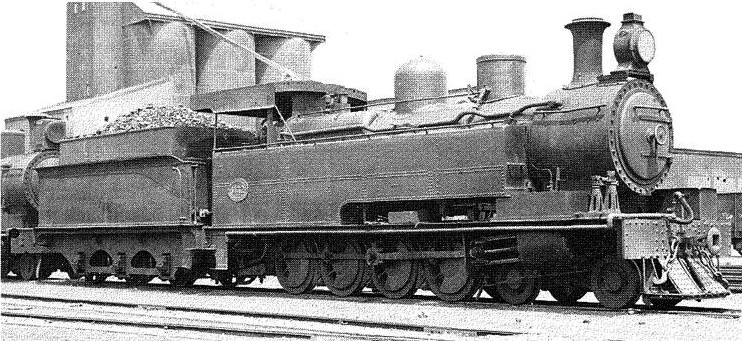
SAR Class 17

Between 1926 and 1929, when a shortage of suitable shunting locomotives developed as a result of increasing traffic throughout the country and particularly on the Witwatersrand, the SAR rebuilt 21 of its Class A 4-8-2T locomotives to Class 17 4-8-0 tank-and-tender locomotives. They were modified by removing the trailing bissel bogie and the coal bunker, shortening the main frame and adding a tender to increase the coal and water capacity. Tenders from various scrapped locomotive types were used and they were employed as shunting engines around Durban and Port Elizabeth. In 1953, two of them were sold to the Zambezi Saw Mills Company for use on their Livingstone-Mulobezi logging railway in Northern Rhodesia. The rest were withdrawn from service by 1961, more than seventy years after the first one was built for the NGR.

=== Soviet Union ===
In the Soviet Union, 4-8-0 locomotives were the first passenger engines to be built by the new state after the October Revolution. One hundred of these locomotives were built by the Putilov Works in Leningrad in 1927. Although intended for speeds up to 100 kilometres per hour (62 miles per hour), they proved unsteady at speed and had to be kept to slower trains. Some were built as oil-burners. Initially built as three-cylinder locomotives, they were later rebuilt as two-cylinder engines since there were apparently severe problems with the crank axle, with up to half the engines being out of service at one point due to such troubles. Boiler pressure in the two-cylinder rebuilds was raised from 185 pounds per square inch (1,280 kilopascals) to 206 pounds per square inch (1,420 kilopascals) and they were reclassified M^{r} (М^{р} in Cyrillic). The M class was not considered to be a great success.

=== Spain ===
RENFE (Red Nacional de los Ferrocarriles Españoles), the Spanish rail system that was nationalised in 1941, inherited 4-8-0 locomotives from the Madrid, Zaragoza and Alicante Railway and continued to construct the type as its 240F class and also existed 4-8-0 Steam Locomotives in the Northern, Andaluces & Western Spain Railway Companies. The last survivors, all oil-burners, were concentrated at the Salamanca shed around 1970, someone Of them survived, for example Oeste 1015.

=== Sudan ===
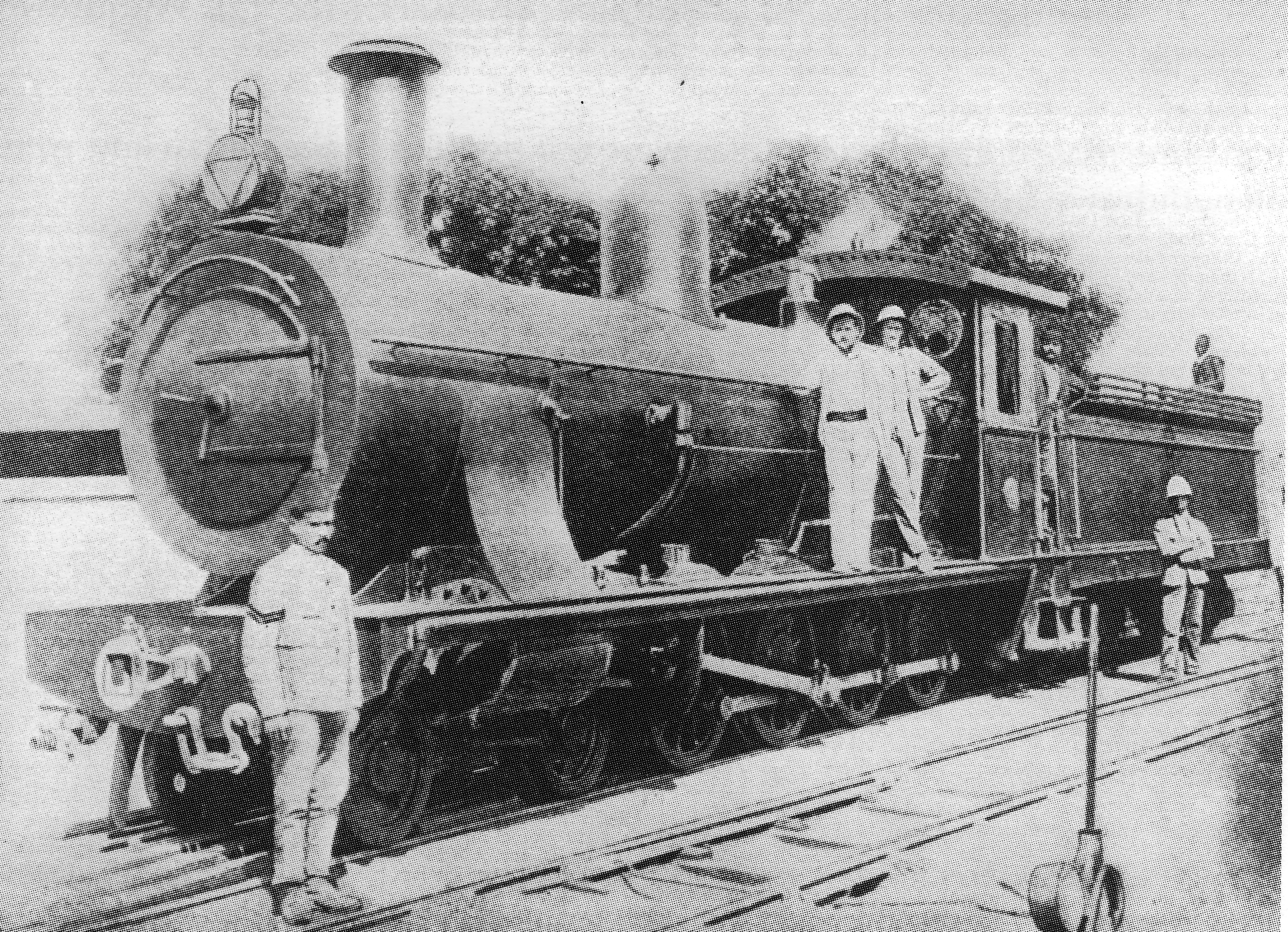
Sudan Dongola Class 4-8-0, c. 1898

Known as the Dongola Class, Cape 7th Class locomotives were also built for the Soudan Military Railway during Kitchener's campaign in Sudan. When he arrived in the territory in 1895, he built a railway strictly for military purposes. It ran parallel to the Nile River for nearly 200 miles (322 kilometres) from Wadi Halfa to the Third Cataract at Kerma. Another line was built from Wadi Halfa across 571 miles (919 kilometres) through the Nubian Desert to Atbarah and on to Khartoum to the south. For motive power, three Cape 7th Class locomotives were ordered from Neilson and Company and delivered in 1897. These were followed by five more in two batches in 1898. The locomotives were initially not numbered, but named after places in Sudan.

=== Sweden ===
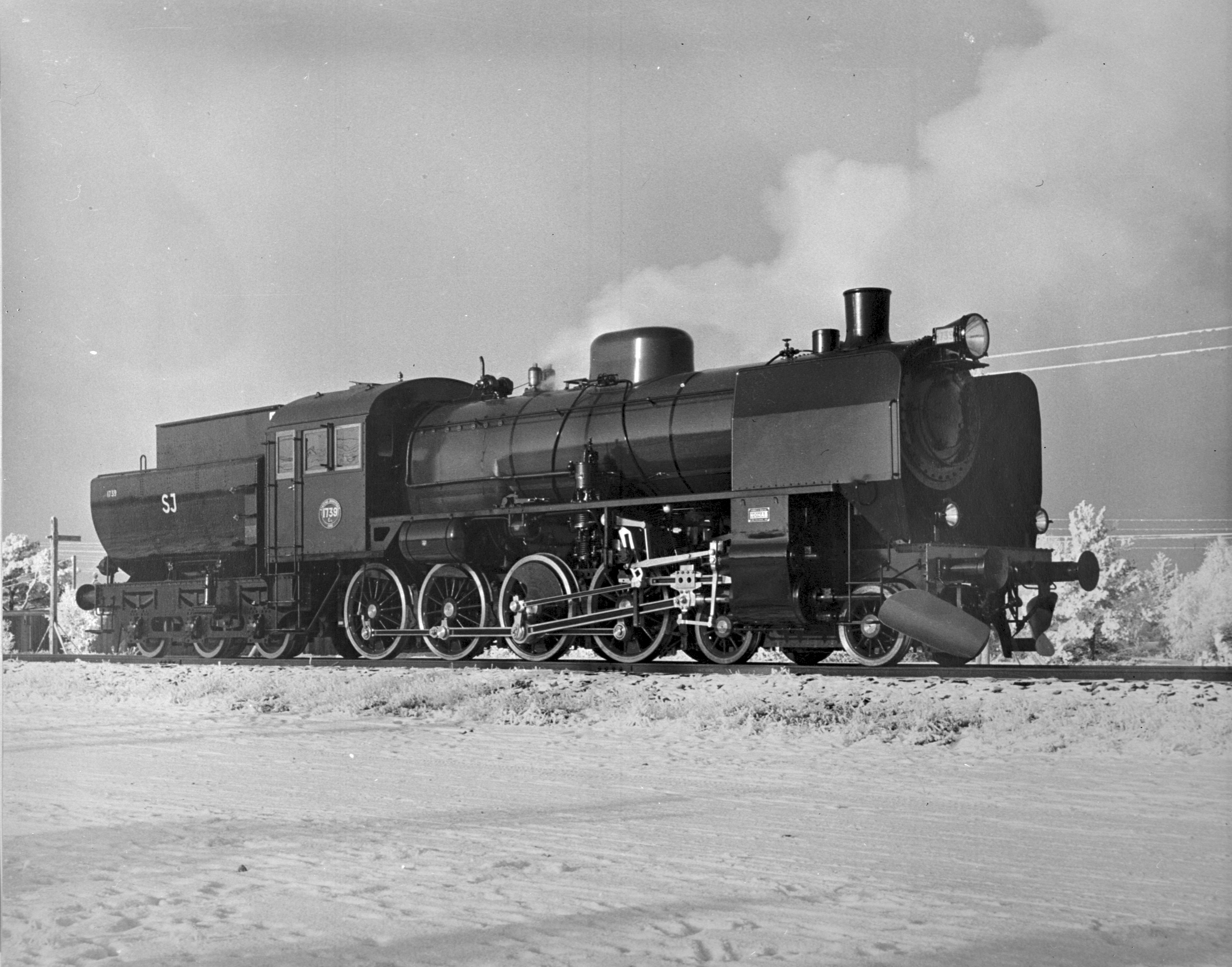
SJ E10 no:1739 delivery photo

The E9 class of Steam locomotives and its improved version the E10 were type 4-8-0 engines. The G12 locomotives had been built for the Halmstad-Nässjö Railway and after nationalization those locomotives had ended up at SJ the state railway company and renamed E9. SJ needed a locomotive with moderate axle weights for the Inland Railway and after being impressed with the E9 ordered an improved variant named the E10 all 10 units of which was delivered in 1947. These were the last large steam engines built in Sweden.

=== United Kingdom ===
Two classes of 4-8-0 tank locomotives were used in the United Kingdom, both built for hump shunting.

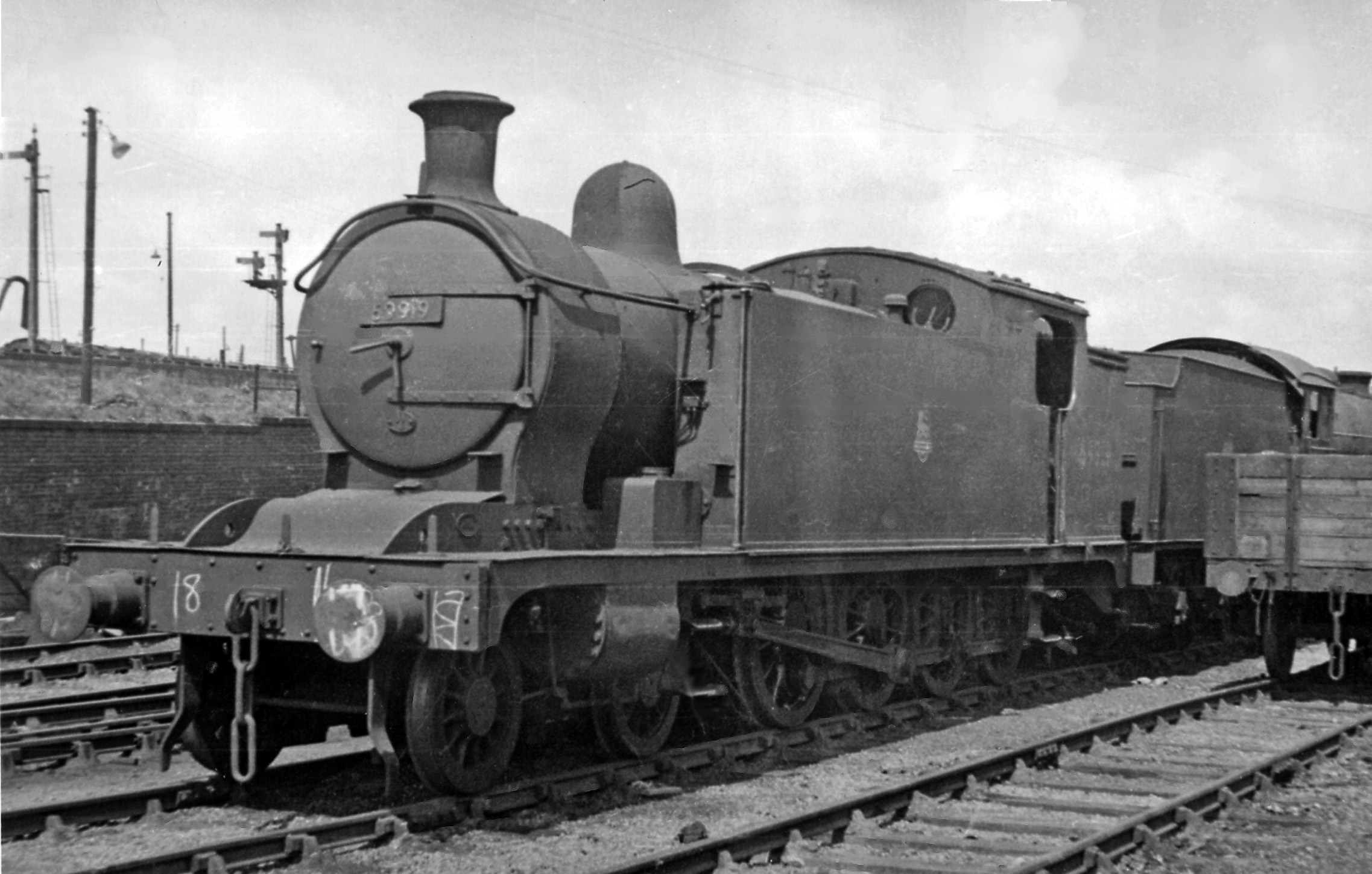
NER Class X, LNER Class T1

- Ten were built by the North Eastern Railway (NER) in 1909 and 1910, designated the NER Class X, later the London and North Eastern Railway (LNER) Class T1. The LNER added a further five Class T1 locomotives in 1925. These locomotives had three cylinders, following Robinson's design for the 0-8-4T Class 8H of the Great Central Railway.
- In 1921, the London and South Western Railway (LSWR) built four G16 class two-cylinder tank locomotives to Urie's design, for use in the Feltham marshalling yard.

The London, Midland and Scottish Railway and the Southern Railway both contemplated the construction of 4-8-0 tender freight locomotives, but these never materialised.

=== United States ===
In the United States, the 4-8-0 was essentially a freight locomotive that was a development of the 2-8-0 Consolidation. Most American 4-8-0 locomotives were built in the late 19th or early 20th century. The type never achieved great popularity, although there were five occasions when a 4-8-0 locomotive was considered as the heaviest and/or most powerful in the world upon its introduction. Those locomotives were the no. 20 Champion of the Lehigh Valley Railroad in 1880, the no. 229 Mastodon of the Central Pacific Railroad in 1882, the G5 class of the Great Northern Railway in 1897 and the no. 640 of the Illinois Central Railroad in 1899. It is noteworthy that the Great Northern G5 had 16-inch-diameter (410 mm) piston valves, as large as the pistons of many locomotives then in service.

Finally, the Duluth and Iron Range Railway ordered a number of trim-lined Mastodons, beginning in 1893, which were reportedly the heaviest freight engines constructed at the time. They had long, between-the-drivers fireboxes and a relatively short stroke for freight engines of the era. They were numbered from 60 to 89 and became the railroad's class J. After 1900, they were gradually phased out in favor of the more conventional Consolidation type. All were scrapped by 1933.

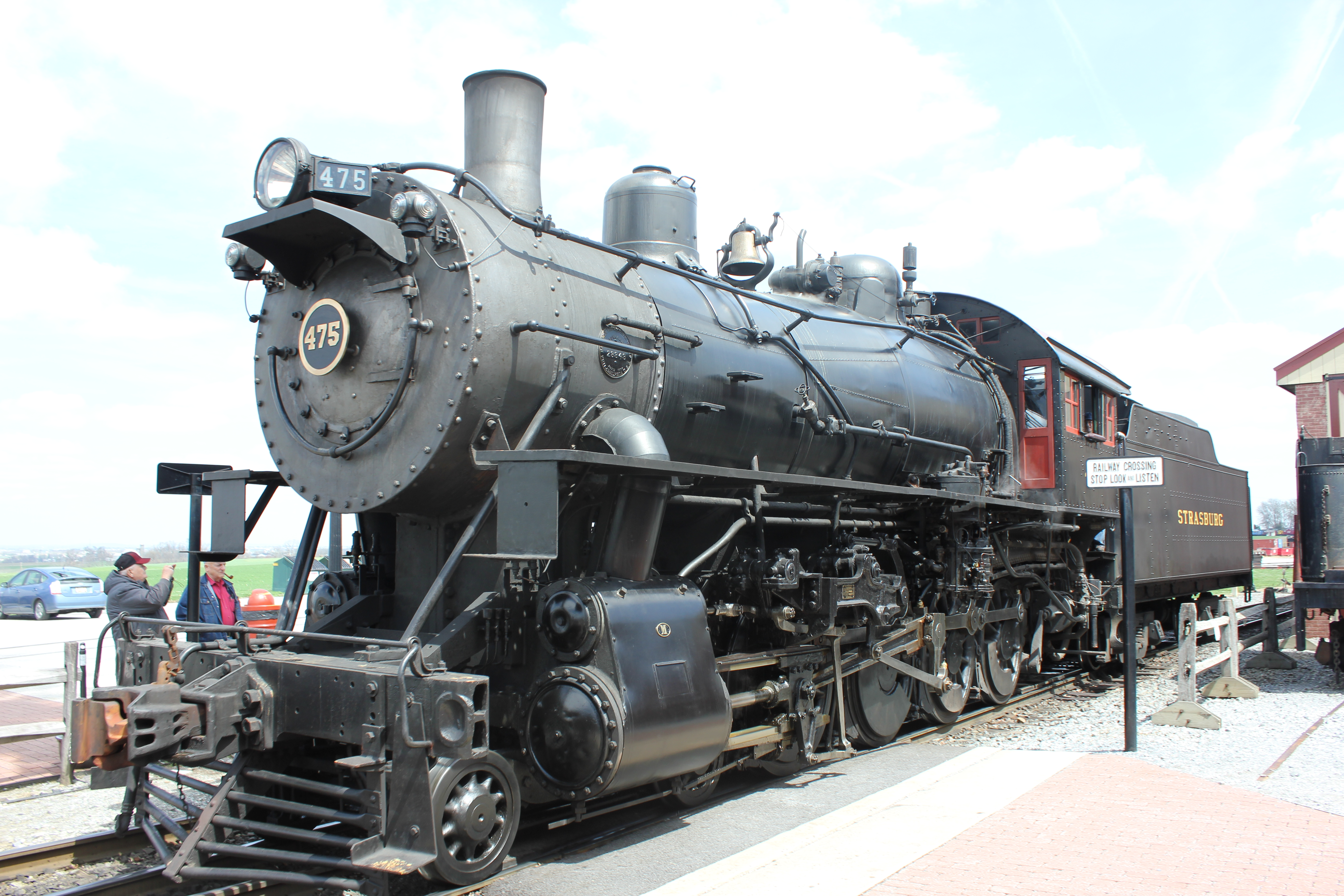
N&W class M no. 475

Even though, at the time, the wide-firebox 2-8-2 Mikado had much more potential as far as speed is concerned, the Norfolk and Western Railway opted for the class M 4-8-0 for its shorter wheelbase that enabled it to have over 90 percent of the locomotive's weight on the driving wheels, and the four-wheel leading truck for greater stability. The N&W operated 4-8-0s from the early 1900s to the late 1950s. Built by Baldwin Locomotive Works from 1906 and nicknamed Mollies, the class M, class M1 and class M2 became the most numerous American class of 4-8-0.

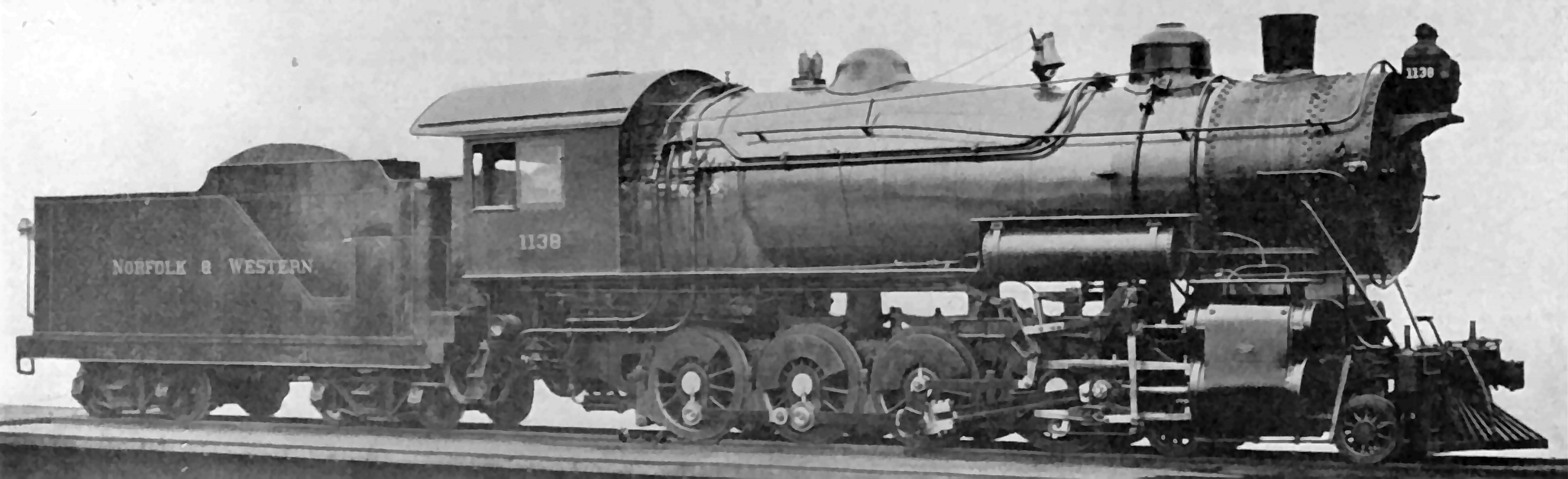
Norfolk & Western class M2

The class M2 locomotives are often mistakenly believed to be the largest conventional 4-8-0s built, but the Mexican PR-8 was over four tons heavier. Many of them lasted into the 1950s, but were poor steamers since the boiler's heating surface had been significantly increased compared to the classes M and M1, but with no corresponding improvement of firebox volume and grate area.

A total of six 4-8-0s are left to survive in the United States, Southern Pacific 2914, Norfolk and Western 433, 475, 1118, 1134, and 1151, and one of them, No. 475, continues to operate for the Strasburg Rail Road in Strasburg, Pennsylvania.

=== Zambia ===
In November 1953, the Zambezi Saw Mills Company (ZSM) in Northern Rhodesia (Zambia since 1964) purchased two Class 17 4-8-0T+T locomotives from the South African Railways for use on their Livingstone-Mulobezi logging railway. The company worked the teak forests that stretched 100 miles (160 kilometres) to the north-west of Livingstone and it built one of the longest logging railways in the world to serve its sawmill at Mulobezi. The locomotives were scrapped between 1961 and 1963.

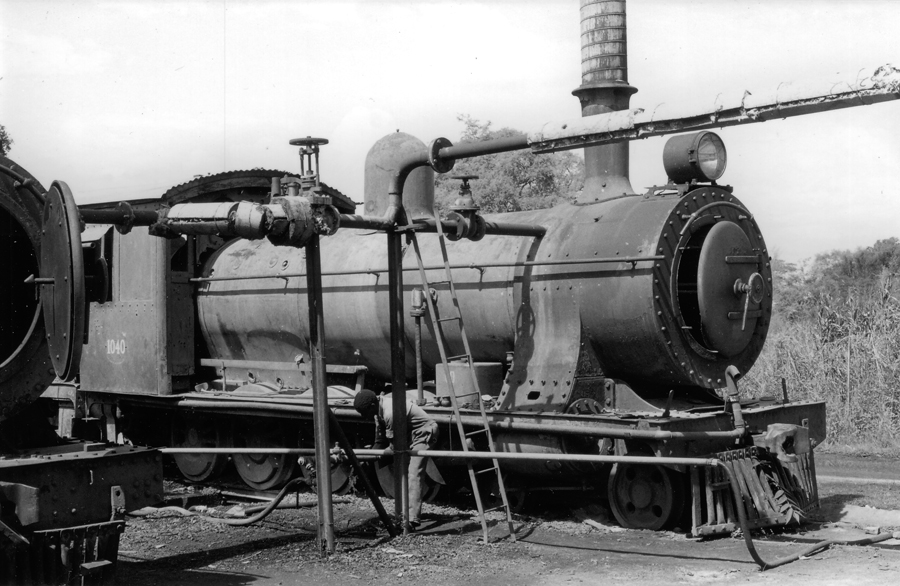
Class 7B as stationary boiler

In 1966, two Class 7, four Class 7A and two Class 7B 4-8-0 locomotives were also purchased by the ZSM from the SAR. These eight locomotives joined the existing fleet of eight ex Rhodesia Railways 7th Class locomotives that had been acquired by the ZSM between 1925 and 1956. After being withdrawn from service, one of the Class 7B locomotives was configured as a stationary boiler at Livingstone.

In November 1971, the ZSM also purchased one Class 8A 4-8-0 locomotive from the SAR. This was the last locomotive to be purchased by the logging company and it was employed as a shunting engine at Mulobezi after logging operations ceased. It was returned to Livingstone in December 1975 and was eventually preserved at the Railway Museum at Livingstone.
