= Central South African Railways Class E locomotives =

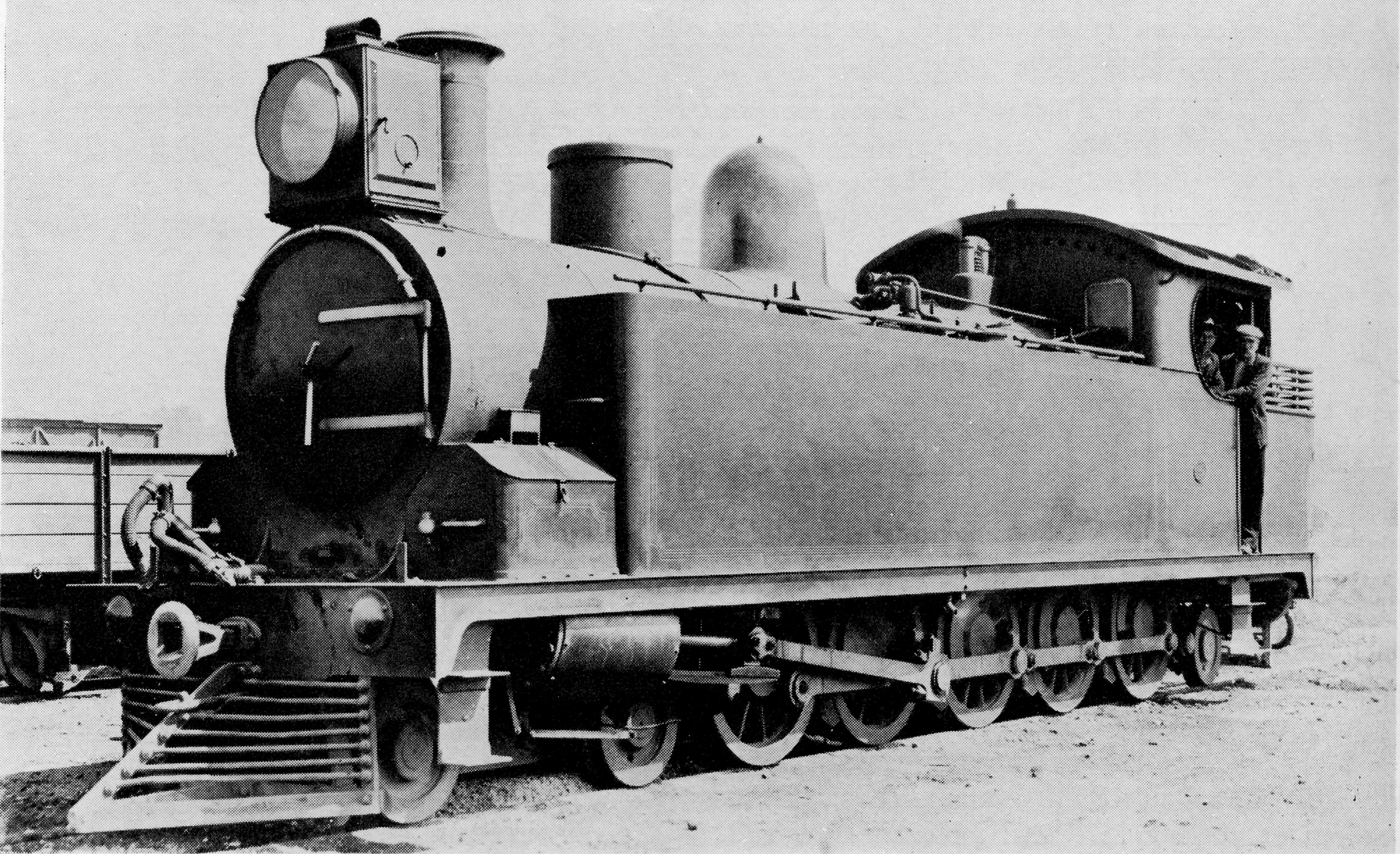
CSAR Class E 4-10-2T

The Central South African Railways Class E locomotives include three locomotive types, all designated Class E irrespective of differences in wheel arrangement or configuration.

When the Union of South Africa was established on 31 May 1910, the three Colonial government railways (Cape Government Railways, Natal Government Railways and Central South African Railways) were united under a single administration to control and administer the railways, ports and harbours of the Union. The two modified types of these locomotives were then designated separate Classes on the new South African Railways.

4-8-0 wheel arrangement

- CSAR Class E 4-8-0TT (Tank-and-tender)

4-8-2 wheel arrangement

- CSAR Class E 4-8-2T (Tank)

4-10-2 wheel arrangement

- CSAR Class E 4-10-2T (Tank)
