= 4-10-2 =

Locomotive wheel arrangement

4-10-2 (Reid Ten wheeler/Overland/Southern Pacific)
- Front of locomotive at left

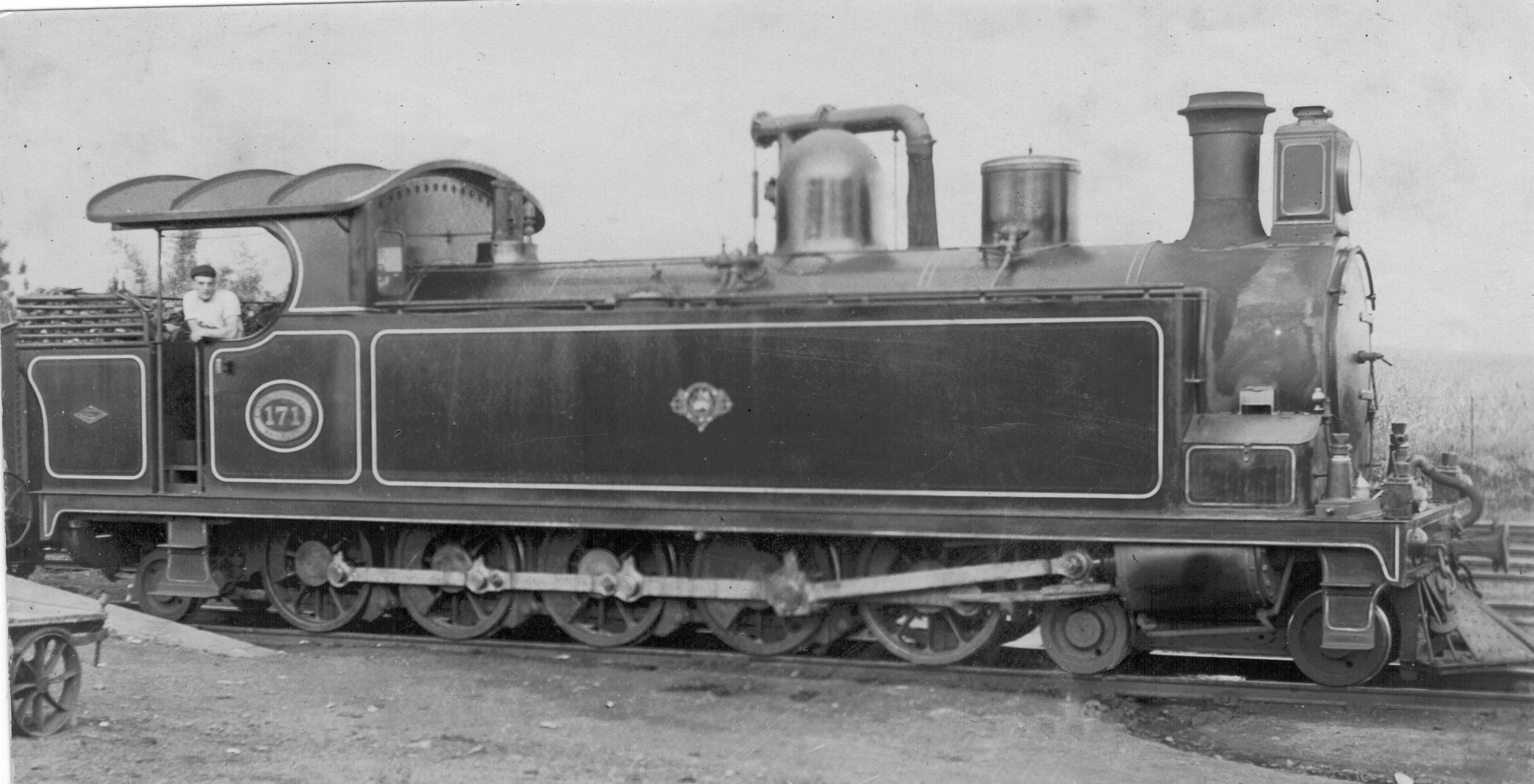
- NGR Class C Reid Tenwheeler 4-10-2T no. 171
Equivalent classifications
- UIC class: 2'E1'
- French class: 251
- Turkish class: 58
- Swiss class: 5/8
- Russian class: 2-5-1
First known tank engine version
- First use: 1899
- Country: Colony of Natal
- Locomotive: NGR Class C
- Railway: Natal Government Railways
- Designer: George William Reid
- Builder: Dübs and Company
- Evolved from: 4-8-2T
First known tender engine version
- First use: 1925
- Country: United States of America
- Locomotive: SP-2 class
- Railway: Southern Pacific Railroad
- Designer: American Locomotive Company
- Builder: American Locomotive Company
- Evolved from: 2-10-2
- Benefits: Could handle roughly 20% more tonnage than the 2-10-2 while using around 16% less fuel than the 2-10-2.
- Drawbacks: Complex to maintain because of the third cylinder
First known "True type" version
- First use: 1925
- Country: United States of America
- Locomotive: Class 8000
- Railway: Union Pacific Railroad
- Designer: American Locomotive Company
- Builder: American Locomotive Company
- Benefits: Improved stability than 2-10-2
- Drawbacks: Way complex to maintain since it has a third cylinder

Under the Whyte notation for the classification of steam locomotives by wheel arrangement, 4-10-2 represents the arrangement of four leading wheels, ten powered and coupled driving wheels and two trailing wheels. In South Africa, where the wheel arrangement was first used, the type was known as a Reid Tenwheeler. In the United States of America it was known as a Southern Pacific on the Southern Pacific Railroad and as an Overland on the Union Pacific Railroad.

== Overview ==
This wheel arrangement was first used on the Natal Government Railways (NGR) in the Colony of Natal in 1899, on a 4-10-2 tank locomotive that was designed to meet the requirement for a locomotive that could haul at least one and a half times as much as an NGR Dübs A 4-8-2T locomotive.

In the United States, a simple expansion (simplex) version of the type was used only on the Southern Pacific and Union Pacific Railroads. Baldwin Locomotive Works built an experimental compound expansion 4-10-2 in 1926, but since the weight and length of this engine was too much for all but the heaviest and straightest track and compound steam locomotives had already lost favor on United States railroads, its demonstration runs failed to generate interest and no more were produced.

== Usage ==
=== Brazil ===
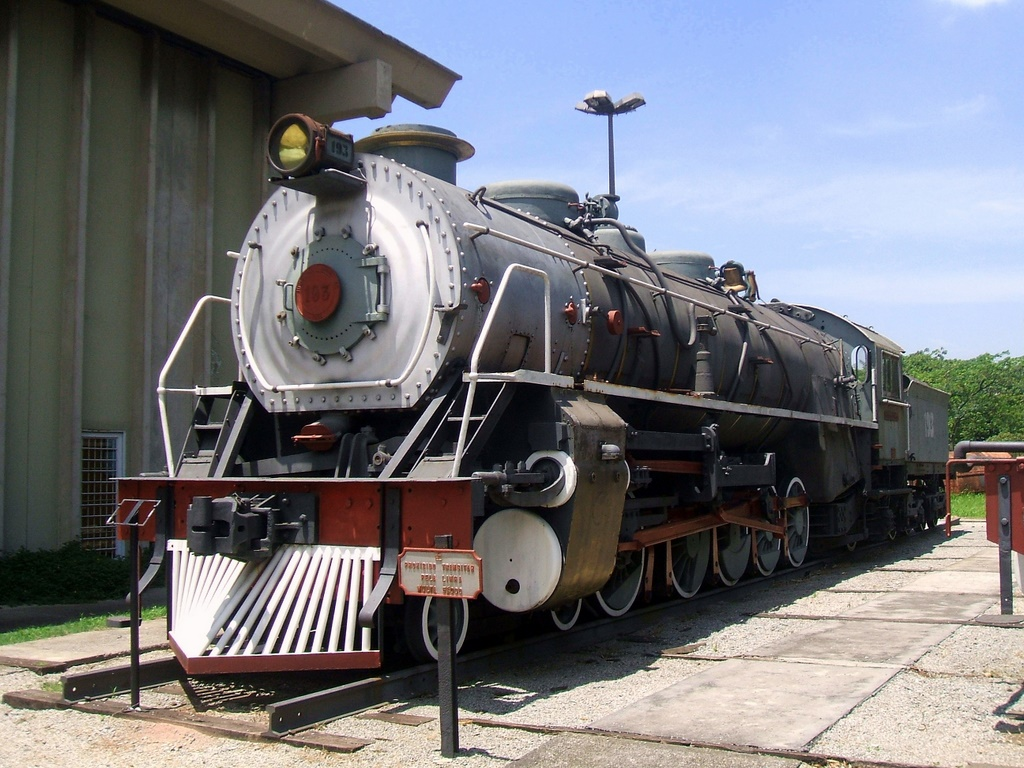
Brazilian 4-10-2 at the Museum of Technology, São Paulo

Brazil had 5 metre gauge 4-10-2 tender locomotives, built by Henschel in 1938. These were later rebuild to Irish gauge (1600mm), the standard in Brazil.

=== South Africa ===
Between 1899 and 1903, the Natal Government Railways (NGR) placed 101 4-10-2 tank locomotives in service. The locomotive was designed by G.W. Reid, the Locomotive Superintendent of the NGR at the end of the nineteenth century, and built in Scotland by Dübs and Company and the newly established North British Locomotive Company. On the NGR, the locomotive type became known as the Reid Tenwheeler and was officially designated Class C.

The locomotive used saturated steam and was equipped with Allan straight link valve gear. The trailing wheels were of the Cartazzi type that allowed the axle some lateral movement. In order to negotiate sharp curves, both the first and fifth sets of coupled wheels were flangeless, but since the blind trailing coupled wheels had a tendency to derail while reversing, particularly over points, their tyre width was later increased from 6 inches (152 millimetres) to 7 inches (178 millimetres). In 1912, after the establishment of the South African Railways, the surviving unmodified NGR locomotives were designated Class H.

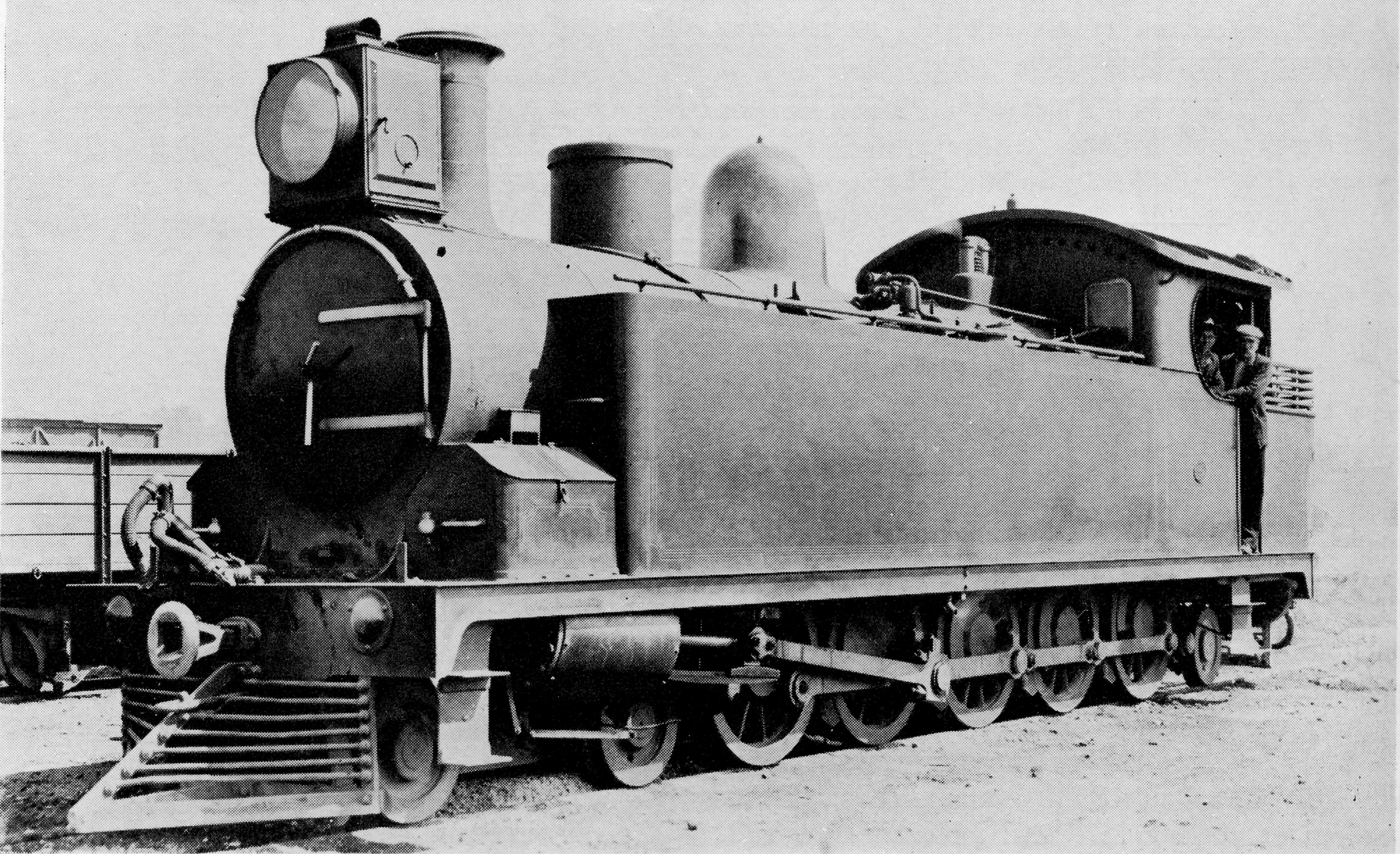
CSAR Class E

In 1901 and 1902, towards the end of the Second Boer War, the Imperial Military Railways also acquired 35 Reid Tenwheeler locomotives from Dübs and Company and Neilson, Reid and Company. After the war, they came onto the roster of the Central South African Railways (CSAR), who designated them Class E. In 1903, the CSAR modified six of them to 4-8-2T locomotives and, beginning in 1905, the remainder to 4-8-0 tank-and-tender locomotives.

A final order for one new Reid Tenwheeler was placed by Witbank Collieries as late as 1927. The total of 137 locomotives built to this design was about double the number of all other 4-10-2 locomotives in use elsewhere in the world, all of which were tender locomotives that served in the United States and Brazil.

=== United States ===
In the United States, the type was used only on the Southern Pacific Railroad (SP), which called it the Southern Pacific, and the Union Pacific Railroad (UP), which called it the Overland after their corporate sobriquet, The Overland Route. Only sixty locomotives of this wheel arrangement were built for domestic service and all but one were constructed as simplex three-cylinder engines.

In 1925, the SP placed an order for sixteen 4-10-2 locomotives with the American Locomotive Company (ALCO) and, later in the same year, the UP ordered one. The first SP locomotive, no. 5000, was completed in April 1925, while the UP locomotive, no. 8000, was completed the following month. Within a few months, the SP ordered more of these engines and built up a fleet of 49. The UP, on the other hand, waited thirteen months before repeating orders and establishing a fleet of ten 4-10-2 locomotives. All 59 were simplex locomotives and were built by ALCO.

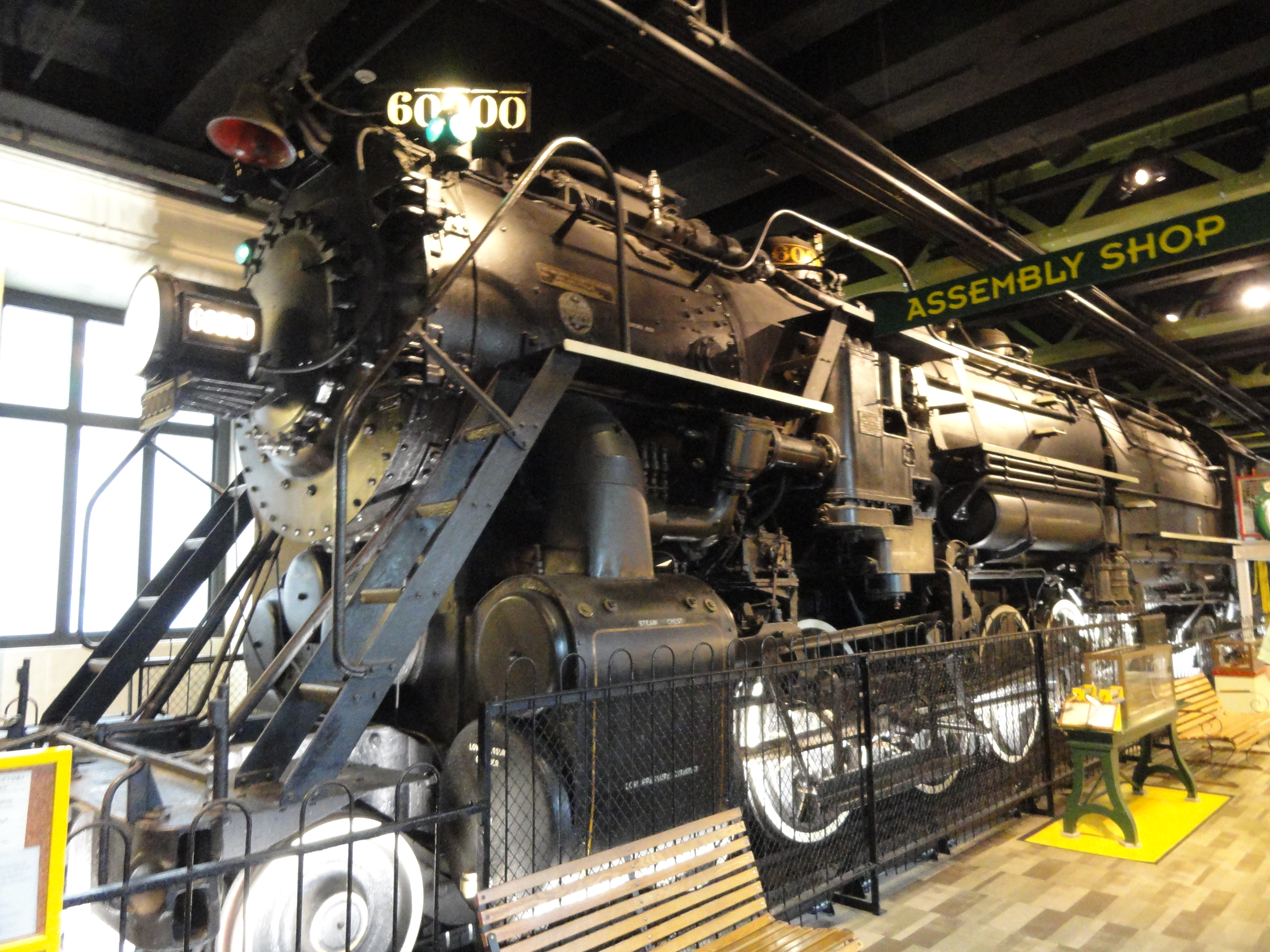
Baldwin 60000 in the Franklin Institute Science Museum

In 1926, Baldwin Locomotive Works constructed an experimental demonstrator, the Baldwin 60000, which was a three-cylinder compound locomotive, the only 4-10-2 so constructed. This engine used high-pressure steam in the inside cylinder and then exhausted that steam into the two low-pressure outside cylinders. It also had a water tube boiler, one of a very few locomotives so equipped in the United States. As technologically innovative as Baldwin's 4-10-2 was, however, it was outmoded when built since compound steam locomotives had already lost favor in United States railroading.

It was found that the 4-10-2 type ran better and rode smoother than the 2-10-2 type from which it had evolved. The third cylinder in the center of the cylinder saddle sloped down at a 9½ degree angle to a crank on the second drivers' axle, while the two outside rods connected to the third drivers. The three-cylinder feature on these locomotives gave them a distinctive sound at work, described as a "hop, skip and jump rhythm".

While the SP engines could operate only on relatively straight and heavily built mainlines, their long service lives of between 28 and 30 years proved that they were good locomotives. The most serious mishap was when, in November 1946, engine number 5037 operating with a diesel coupled to the front end suffered a boiler explosion which killed four train crew. In addition, the inside cylinder's rod created serious maintenance problems because the floating bushings could fail, which lengthen maintenance down-time since such failures required major valve re-settings that caused delays. It was reported that such failures created such great pounding on the rails that railroad housewives along the line "complained of crockery cracking when a defective 4-10-2 rumbled past their homes".

When the UP became tired of the major mechanical problems associated with three cylinders, it converted its locomotives to two-cylinder locomotives in 1942 and renumbered them 5090 to 5099.

Two locomotives of this type have been preserved:

- Southern Pacific 5021, on static display at the Los Angeles County Fairgrounds in Pomona, California.
- The Baldwin 60000 demonstrator, on display at the Franklin Institute Science Museum in Philadelphia, Pennsylvania.

Operators & Variants
Operator	Class	Builder	Built	Number Built	Notes
Baldwin Locomotive Works	60000	Baldwin Locomotive Works	1926	1	Experimental Baldwin's 60000th locomotive. With a 350 PSI boiler. Preserved in Franklin Institute Science Museum.
Union Pacific	FTT-1	ALCO-Brooks	1925	10	
Southern Pacific	SP-Class (1/2/3)	ALCO-Schenectady	1925	49	SP-2 5021 preserved on Los Angeles County Fairgrounds.
