= CSAR Class E 4-10-2T =

Type of steam locomotive

IMR Reid Tenwheeler 4-10-2T CSAR Class E 4-10-2T
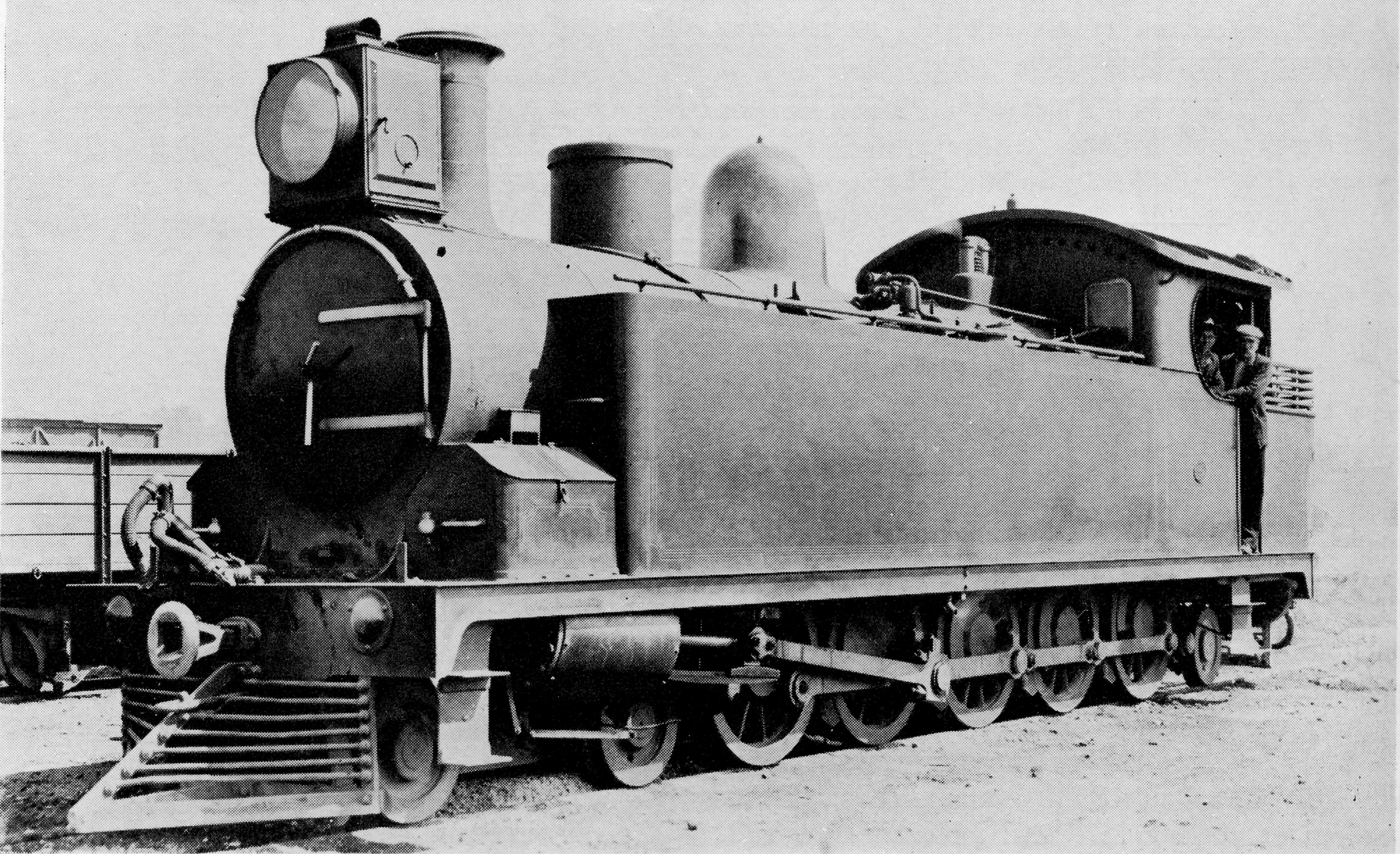
- CSAR Class E, ex IMR Reid Tenwheeler, c. 1902
Type and origin
- Power type: Steam
- Designer: Natal Government Railways (G.W. Reid)
- Builder: Dübs and Company; Neilson, Reid and Company
- Serial number: Dübs 4086-4100; Neilson 6196-6215
- Model: NGR Reid Tenwheeler
- Build date: 1901-1902
- Total produced: 35
- Rebuilder: Central South African Railways
- Rebuild date: 1903-1905
- Number rebuilt: 6 to 4-8-2T (Mountain); 29 to 4-8-0TT (Mastodon)
Specifications
- Configuration
  - Whyte: 4-10-2T (Reid Tenwheeler)
  - UIC: 2'E1'n2t
- Driver: 2nd coupled axle
- Gauge: 3 ft 6 in (1,067 mm) Cape gauge
- Leading dia.: 25 3/4 in (654 mm)
- Coupled dia.: 45 in (1,143 mm)
- Trailing dia.: 25 3/4 in (654 mm)
- Minimum curve: 300 ft (91 m)
- Wheelbase: 30 ft 6 in (9,296 mm)
  - Leading: 5 ft 4 in (1,626 mm)
  - Coupled: 16 ft 8 in (5,080 mm)
- Length
  - Over couplers: 37 ft 6 in (11,430 mm)
- Height: 12 ft 6 in (3,810 mm)
- Frame type: Plate
- Axle load: 12 LT 5 cwt (12,450 kg)
  - Leading: 9 LT 17 cwt (10,010 kg)
  - 1st coupled: 10 LT 18 cwt (11,070 kg)
  - 2nd coupled: 12 LT 5 cwt (12,450 kg)
  - 3rd coupled: 10 LT 13 cwt (10,820 kg)
  - 4th coupled: 10 LT 10 cwt (10,670 kg)
  - 5th coupled: 10 LT 10 cwt (10,670 kg)
  - Trailing: 4 LT 4 cwt (4,267 kg)
- Adhesive weight: 54 LT 16 cwt (55,680 kg)
- Loco weight: 68 LT 17 cwt (69,950 kg)
- Fuel type: Coal
- Fuel capacity: 4 LT (4.1 t)
- Water cap.: 1,880 imp gal (8,500 L)
- Firebox
  - Type: Round-top
  - Grate area: 21.15 sq ft (1.965 m^{2})
- Boiler
  - Pitch: 6 ft 10 in (2,083 mm)
  - Diameter: 4 ft 7 7/8 in (1,419 mm)
  - Tube plates: 10 ft 4 in (3,150 mm)
  - Small tubes: 287: 1 3/4 in (44 mm)
- Boiler pressure: 175 psi (1,207 kPa)
- Safety valve: Ramsbottom
- Heating surface
  - Firebox: 134.79 sq ft (12.522 m^{2})
  - Tubes: 1,358.71 sq ft (126.228 m^{2})
  - Total surface: 1,493.5 sq ft (138.75 m^{2})
- Cylinders: Two
- Cylinder size: 19 in (483 mm) bore 27 in (686 mm) stroke
- Valve gear: Allan
- Couplers: Johnston link-and-pin
Performance figures
- Tractive effort: 28,440 lbf (126.5 kN) @ 75%
Career
- Operators: Imperial Military Railways; Central South African Railways
- Class: IMR Reid Tenwheeler; CSAR Class E
- Number in class: 35
- Numbers: IMR & CSAR 220-254
- Delivered: 1901-1902
- First run: 1901
- The leading & trailing coupled axles had flangeless wheels

The Central South African Railways Class E 4-10-2T of 1901 was a South African steam locomotive from the pre-Union era in Transvaal.

In 1901 and 1902, during the Second Boer War, the Imperial Military Railways placed 35 tank locomotives with a 4-10-2T wheel arrangement in service, built to the design of the Reid Tenwheeler of the Natal Government Railways. In 1902, they came onto the roster of the Central South African Railways and were designated Class E.

== Origin ==
When the Natal Government Railways (NGR) identified a requirement for a tank locomotive which could haul at least one-and-a-half times as much as a Dübs A 4-8-2T locomotive, a 4-10-2 tank locomotive was designed by George W. Reid, Locomotive Superintendent of the NGR at the end of the nineteenth century. On the NGR, these locomotives became known as the Reid Tenwheelers, later designated the NGR Class C.

== Manufacturers ==
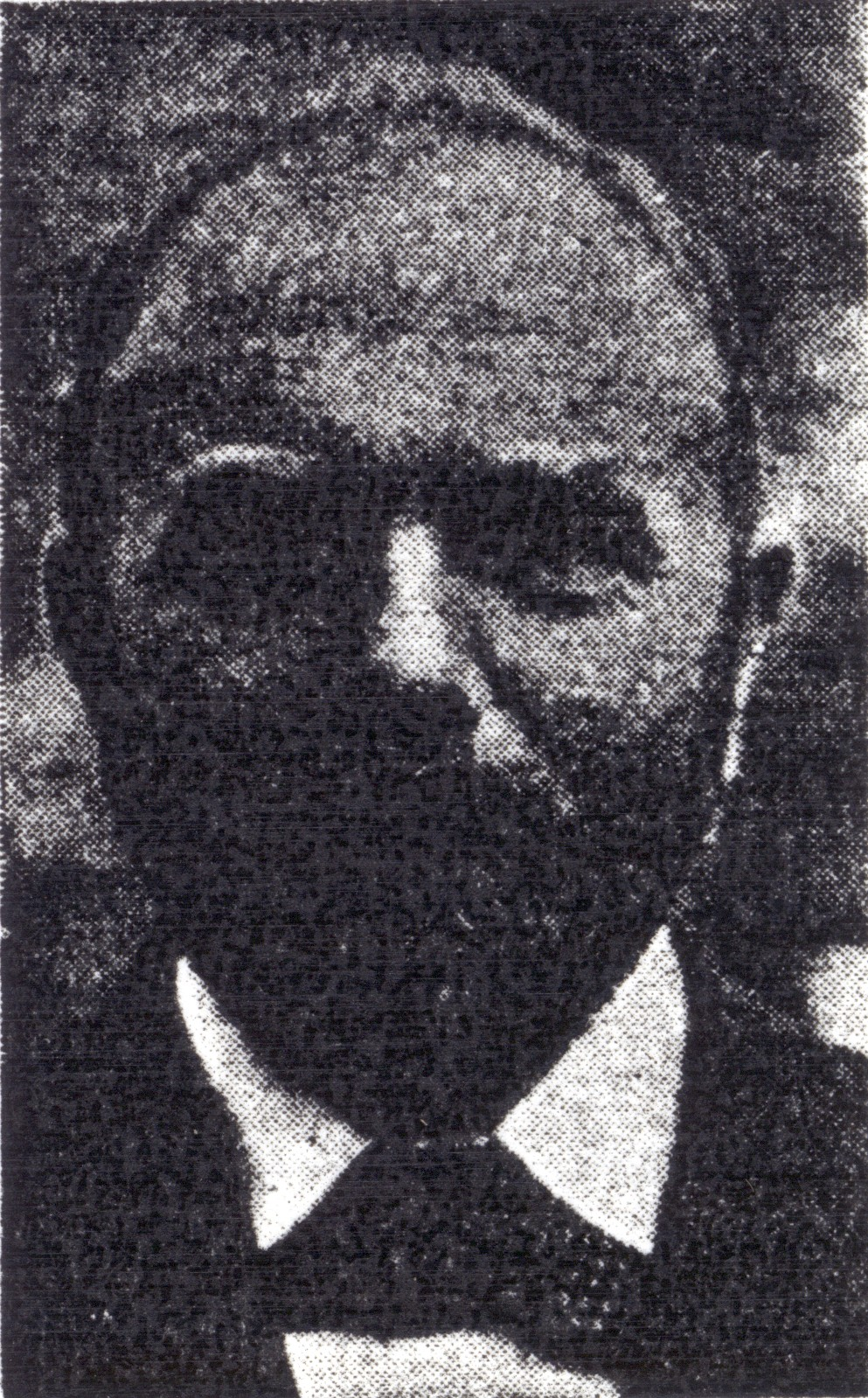
G.W. Reid

In 1901, during the Second Boer War, the Imperial Military Railways (IMR) of the invading British forces experienced a shortage of locomotives as a result of damage caused during hostilities and the transportation demands of the British Military. Lieutenant-Colonel E.P.C. Girouard KCMG DSO RE, the Commissioner of Railways for the Transvaal and Orange River Colony, therefore placed urgent orders for 35 locomotives of the NGR's Reid Tenwheeler type.

To ensure rapid delivery, the order was split between Dübs and Company, who built engine numbers 220 to 234, and Neilson, Reid and Company, who built numbers 235 to 254.

== Characteristics ==
To be able to negotiate sharp curves, both the first and fifth pairs of coupled wheels of the Reid Tenwheeler locomotive were flangeless. The locomotive used saturated steam and was equipped with Allan straight link valve gear. The trailing Bissel truck was of the Cartazzi type, which allowed the axle some lateral movement.

The main shortcoming of the Reid Tenwheeler was a tendency to derail while reversing, particularly over points, since the trailing drivers were flangeless. On the NGR, this was overcome by increasing the tyre width of these wheels from 6 inches (152 millimetres) to 7 inches (178 millimetres).

While the IMR locomotive was identical in construction to those built for the NGR, it had a weatherboard affixed to the coal bunker to offer the crew better protection against the elements when travelling bunker forward. The locomotives were more ornate than those in Natal and, in true military style, their brass domes, chimney caps and boiler bands were polished. The practice of polished brasswork was a trade mark of the IMR and was done with all their new locomotives. It was continued on the Central South African Railways (CSAR) after the IMR was disbanded.

== Service ==
=== Imperial Military Railways ===
The Royal Engineer officers of the IMR considered the Reid Tenwheeler as an excellent and handy type of locomotive for the heavy gradients of 1 in 100 (1%) to 1 in 50 (2%). Most of the IMR's Reid Tenwheelers had been in service for less than a year when peace was declared on 1 June 1902. On 1 July 1902, the control of the railways was handed back to civilian authority.

=== Central South African Railways ===
The IMR was transformed into the CSAR, who took control of all railways in the Transvaal and the Orange Free State. One of the first steps taken by the CSAR was to classify and renumber all the locomotive stock, with tank locomotives classified alphabetically and tender locomotives numerically. The Reid Tenwheeler engines were designated Class E, but retained their IMR engine numbers.

Rebuilding to 4-8-2T Mountain

From c. 1903, six locomotives, numbers 222, 233 to 235, 245 and 252, were converted to 4-8-2T Mountain type engines by removing the fifth pair of coupled wheels and blanking off the resulting opening in the frame, similar to the modification which was being done by the NGR on its own Reid Tenwheelers to make them better suited for the tight curves encountered on points during yard working.

Rebuilding to 4-8-0TT Mastodon

Since the small coal and water capacity of the Reid Tenwheelers limited their radius of action, one of them was converted to a tank-and-tender configuration in 1904. The coal bunker, trailing bissel truck and the fifth pair of coupled wheels were removed, the frame was shortened and the locomotive was equipped with a tender from an obsolete Cape 4th class locomotive. As a tank-and-tender type, the modified locomotive was able to haul the same load as before, used less oil, was less troublesome and was considered by crews to be much more comfortable. As a result, the remaining 28 unmodified Reid Tenwheelers were similarly modified to the 4-8-0TT Mastodon type configuration, using three-axle tenders from CSAR Class 6-L2 locomotives. This increased the coal capacity from 4 to 5 1/2 long tons (4.1 to 5.6 tonnes) and the water capacity from 1,880 to 4,320 imperial gallons (8,500 to 19,600 litres), which resulted in a considerable increase in the operating range of the locomotive.

Both modified versions of the locomotive were not reclassified on the CSAR, but were referred to as the Class E Converted. By 1912, when the classification and renumbering of all the rolling stock of the Cape Government Railways, NGR and CSAR onto the South African Railways roster took place, none of these locomotives survived in their original 4-10-2T Reid Tenwheeler configuration.

== Works numbers ==
The CSAR Class E builders, works numbers, rebuilding and disposition are listed in the table.

CSAR Class E 4-10-2T
IMR & CSAR no.	Builder	Works no.	Rebuilt to	SAR no.
220	Dübs	4086	4-8-0TT	1310
221	Dübs	4087	4-8-0TT	1311
222	Dübs	4088	4-8-2T	222
223	Dübs	4089	4-8-0TT	1312
224	Dübs	4090	4-8-0TT	1313
225	Dübs	4091	4-8-0TT	1314
226	Dübs	4092	4-8-0TT	1315
227	Dübs	4093	4-8-0TT	1316
228	Dübs	4094	4-8-0TT	1317
229	Dübs	4095	4-8-0TT	1318
230	Dübs	4096	4-8-0TT	1319
231	Dübs	4097	4-8-0TT	1320
232	Dübs	4098	4-8-0TT	1321
233	Dübs	4099	4-8-2T	223
234	Dübs	4100	4-8-2T	Scrapped
235	Neilson, Reid	6196	4-8-2T	224
236	Neilson, Reid	6197	4-8-0TT	1322
237	Neilson, Reid	6198	4-8-0TT	1323
238	Neilson, Reid	6199	4-8-0TT	1324
239	Neilson, Reid	6200	4-8-0TT	1325
240	Neilson, Reid	6201	4-8-0TT	1326
241	Neilson, Reid	6202	4-8-0TT	1327
242	Neilson, Reid	6203	4-8-0TT	1328
243	Neilson, Reid	6204	4-8-0TT	1329
244	Neilson, Reid	6205	4-8-0TT	1330
245	Neilson, Reid	6206	4-8-2T	225
246	Neilson, Reid	6207	4-8-0TT	1331
247	Neilson, Reid	6208	4-8-0TT	1332
248	Neilson, Reid	6209	4-8-0TT	1333
249	Neilson, Reid	6210	4-8-0TT	1334
250	Neilson, Reid	6211	4-8-0TT	1335
251	Neilson, Reid	6212	4-8-0TT	1336
252	Neilson, Reid	6213	4-8-2T	226
253	Neilson, Reid	6214	4-8-0TT	1337
254	Neilson, Reid	6215	4-8-0TT	1338
