= Southern Pacific 5021 =

SP-2 class 4-10-2 steam locomotive

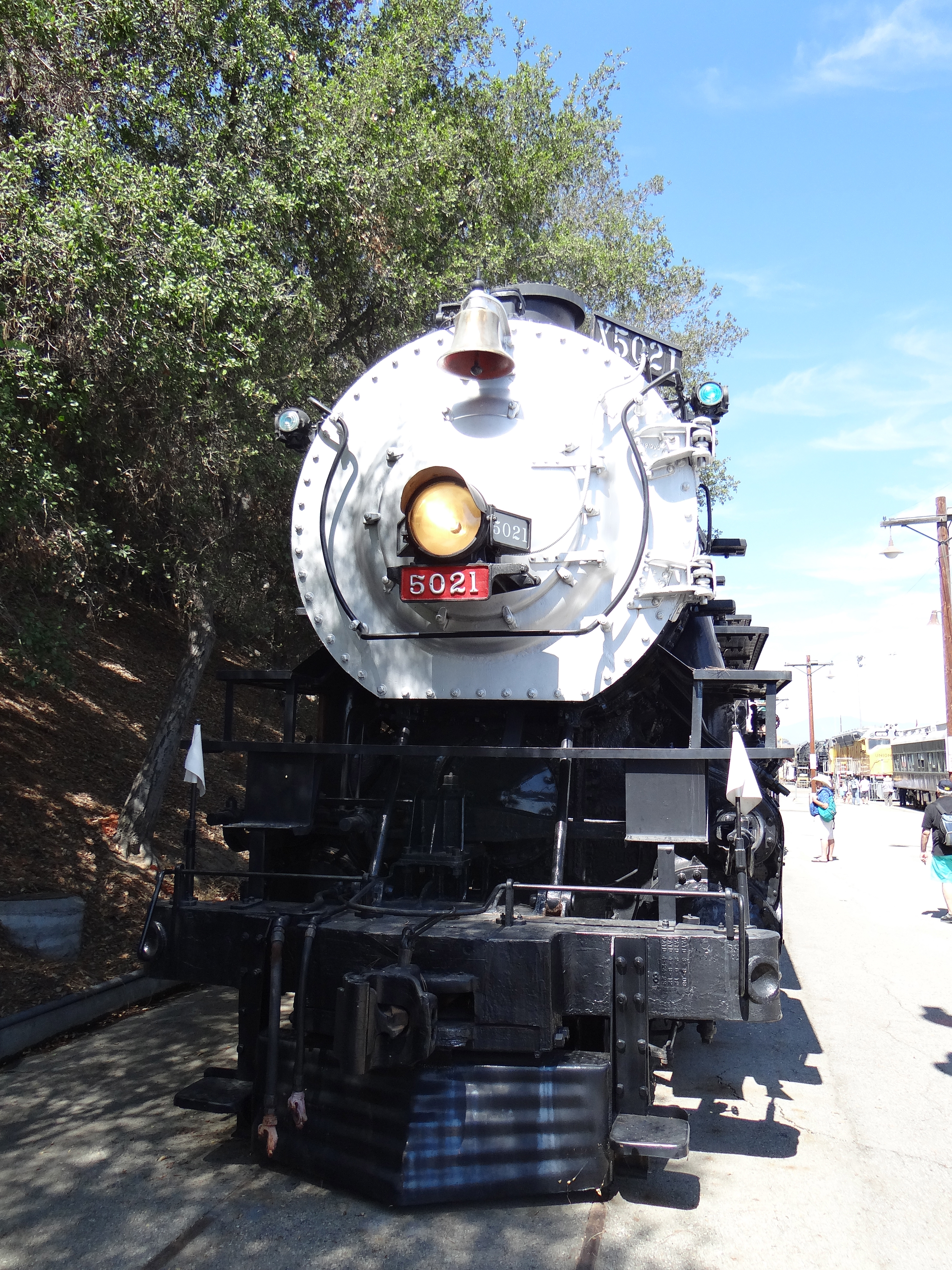
- Southern Pacific 5021 on display at RailGiants in September 2013
Type and origin
- Power type: Steam
- Builder: American Locomotive Company
- Serial number: 66793
- Build date: 1926
Specifications
- Configuration
  - Whyte: 4-10-2
- Gauge: 4 ft 8 1/2 in (1,435 mm) standard gauge
- Driver dia.: 63 1/2 in (1,613 mm)
- Adhesive weight: 317,500 lb (144,000 kg)
- Fuel type: Oil
- Fuel capacity: 4,912 US gal (18,590 L; 4,090 imp gal)
- Water cap.: 16,152 US gal (61,140 L; 13,449 imp gal)
- Boiler pressure: 225 psi (1,550 kPa)
- Cylinders: Three, inside
- Cylinder size: (inside) 25 in × 28 in (635 mm × 711 mm) dia × stroke (outside) 25 in × 32 in (635 mm × 813 mm) dia × stroke
- Valve gear: Walschaerts (inside); Gresley (outside)
- Loco brake: Air
- Train brakes: Air
Performance figures
- Maximum speed: 70 mph (113 km/h) (Passenger Service)
- Tractive effort: 84,200 lbf (375,000 N); 96,540 lbf (429,400 N) with booster
Career
- Operators: Southern Pacific Railroad
- Class: SP-2
- Number in class: 49
- Numbers: SP 5021
- Retired: 1955 (revenue service); September 1961 (excursion service)
- Preserved: March 8, 1956
- Restored: September 1961
- Current owner: Railway and Locomotive Historical Society
- Disposition: On static display

Southern Pacific 5021 is an SP-2 class 4-10-2 type steam locomotive, built in 1926 by American Locomotive Company (ALCO) at their Schenectady, New York, shops. It is the only member of this class of SP locomotives to be preserved, and it is one of only five three-cylinder locomotives preserved in North America.

The locomotive was built in 1926 by American Locomotive Company (ALCO) for the Southern Pacific Railroad (SP). It was designed to haul mixed freight and passenger trains over the Sierra Nevada range between northern California and Nevada. Later in its career, No. 5021 was shifted to service in Oregon, where it remained until its retirement in 1955.

Southern Pacific donated No. 5021 to the Railway and Locomotive Historical Society on March 8, 1956. In September 1961, it was briefly fired up and hauled various equipment around the Los Angeles County Fairgrounds.

As of 2025, No. 5021 is on permanent display at the RailGiants Train Museum in Pomona, California.

== Bibliography ==
- Diebert, Timothy S. & Strapac, Joseph A. (1987). Southern Pacific Company Steam Locomotive Compendium. Shade Tree Books. ISBN 0-930742-12-5.
