= Baldwin 60000 =

Preserved steam locomotive

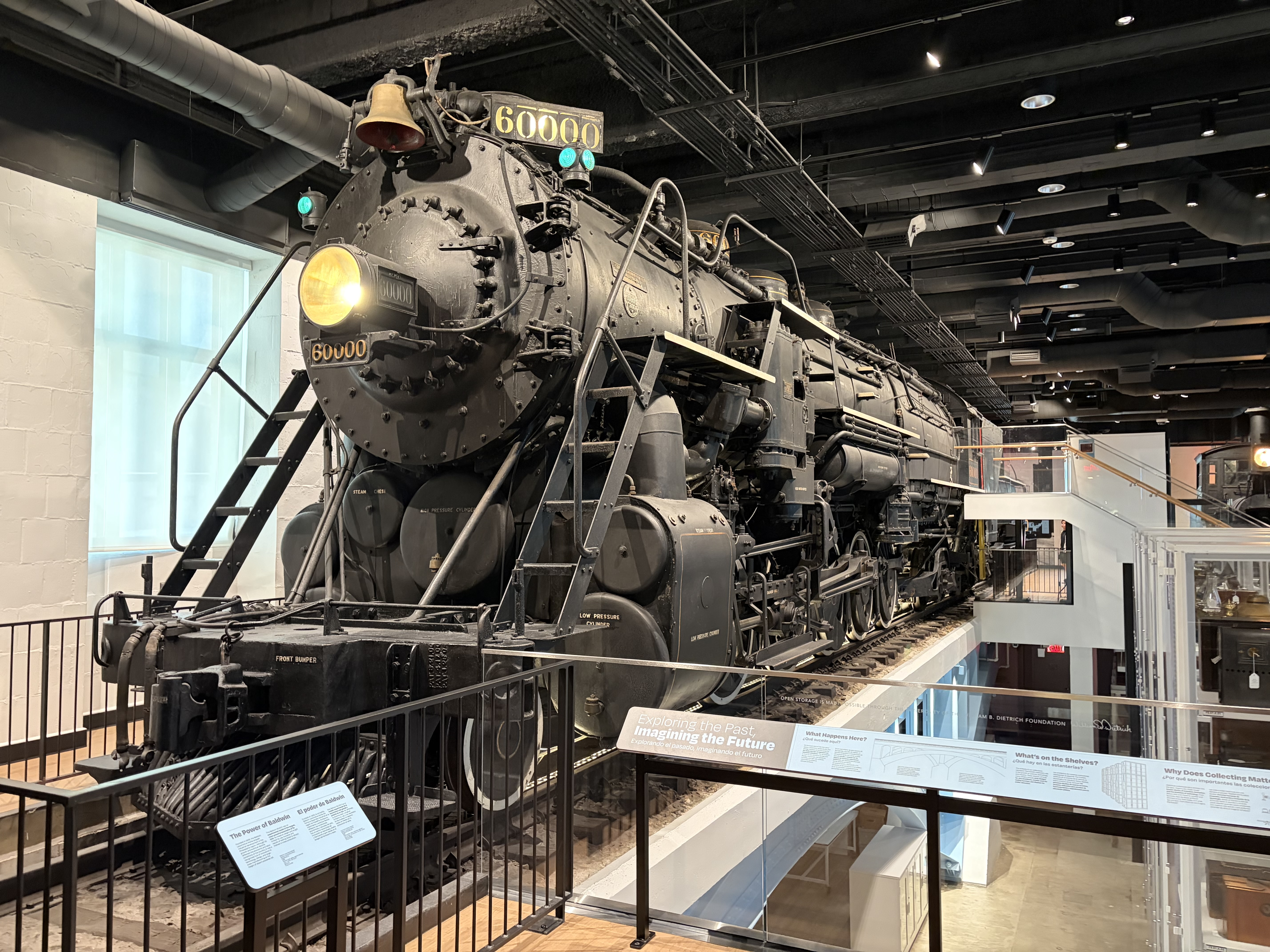
- Baldwin No. 60000 in the Franklin Institute
Type and origin
- Power type: Steam
- Builder: Baldwin Locomotive Works
- Serial number: 60000
- Model: 16-3-48/48-1/4-F
- Build date: 1926
Specifications
- Configuration
  - Whyte: 4-10-2
  - UIC: 2′E1′ h3v
- Gauge: 4 ft 8 1/2 in (1,435 mm) standard gauge
- Leading dia.: 33 in (838 mm)
- Driver dia.: 63.5 in (1,613 mm)
- Trailing dia.: 45.5 in (1,156 mm)
- Adhesive weight: 338,400 lb (153,500 kg; 153.5 t)
- Loco weight: 457,500 lb (207,500 kg; 207.5 t)
- Total weight: 700,900 lb (317,900 kg; 317.9 t)
- Fuel type: Coal (Briefly converted to oil)
- Fuel capacity: 32,000 lb (15,000 kg; 15 t)
- Water cap.: 12,000 US gallons (45,000 L; 10,000 imp gal)
- Firebox
  - Grate area: 82.5 sq ft (7.66 m^{2})
- Boiler: 84 in (2,134 mm)
- Boiler pressure: 350 psi (2.41 MPa)
- Heating surface
  - Firebox: 745 sq ft (69.2 m^{2})
  - Tubes and flues: 5,192 sq ft (482.4 m^{2})
- Superheater
  - Heating area: 1,357 sq ft (126.1 m^{2})
- Cylinders: Center: 1 HP; Outside: 2 LP
- High-pressure cylinder: 27 in × 32 in (686 mm × 813 mm)
- Low-pressure cylinder: 27 in × 32 in (686 mm × 813 mm)
- Valve gear: Walschaerts valve gear
- Valve type: 14 in (356 mm) piston valves
- Loco brake: Westinghouse air brake
- Train brakes: Westinghouse air brake
- Couplers: Knuckle coupler
Performance figures
- Maximum speed: 70 mph (110 km/h)
- Power output: 4,515 hp (3.37 MW)
- Tractive effort: 82,500 lbf (367.0 kN)
Career
- Operators: Baldwin Locomotive Works
- Nicknames: Baldwin Boomer
- Retired: Stored: 1928, Sold: 1933
- Current owner: Franklin Institute Science Museum
- Disposition: Indoor stationary display - until the mid 2010s, it moved back and forth 15 feet (4.6 m) on a short track powered by hydraulics

Baldwin 60000 is a one-off experimental steam locomotive built by the Baldwin Locomotive Works in Eddystone, Pennsylvania, in 1926, during the height of the railroading industry. It received its number for being the 60,000th locomotive built by Baldwin.

It was designed to be the best locomotive that Baldwin ever made. It has three cylinders, weighs about 350 short tons (318 t; 313 long tons), including tender, and can pull a load of up to 7,000 short tons (6,400 t; 6,200 long tons). Its top speed is 70 mph (110 km/h).

60000 was highly innovative, carrying unusual technology such as a water-tube firebox. This was intended to improve efficiency but the tubes were prone to burst inside the firebox. It is also a compound, expanding the steam once in the inside cylinder and then again in the two outside cylinders. Although compounding increases efficiency, it was an extra complication that the US railroads had mostly rejected by the middle twenties. The weight and length of the engine were too much for all but the heaviest and straightest tracks.

This locomotive was experimental and was meant to be the model for future development. However, its demonstration runs never persuaded railroads to purchase more. In 1933, it was donated to the Franklin Institute Science Museum in Philadelphia, Pennsylvania and remains there today.

== Testing ==
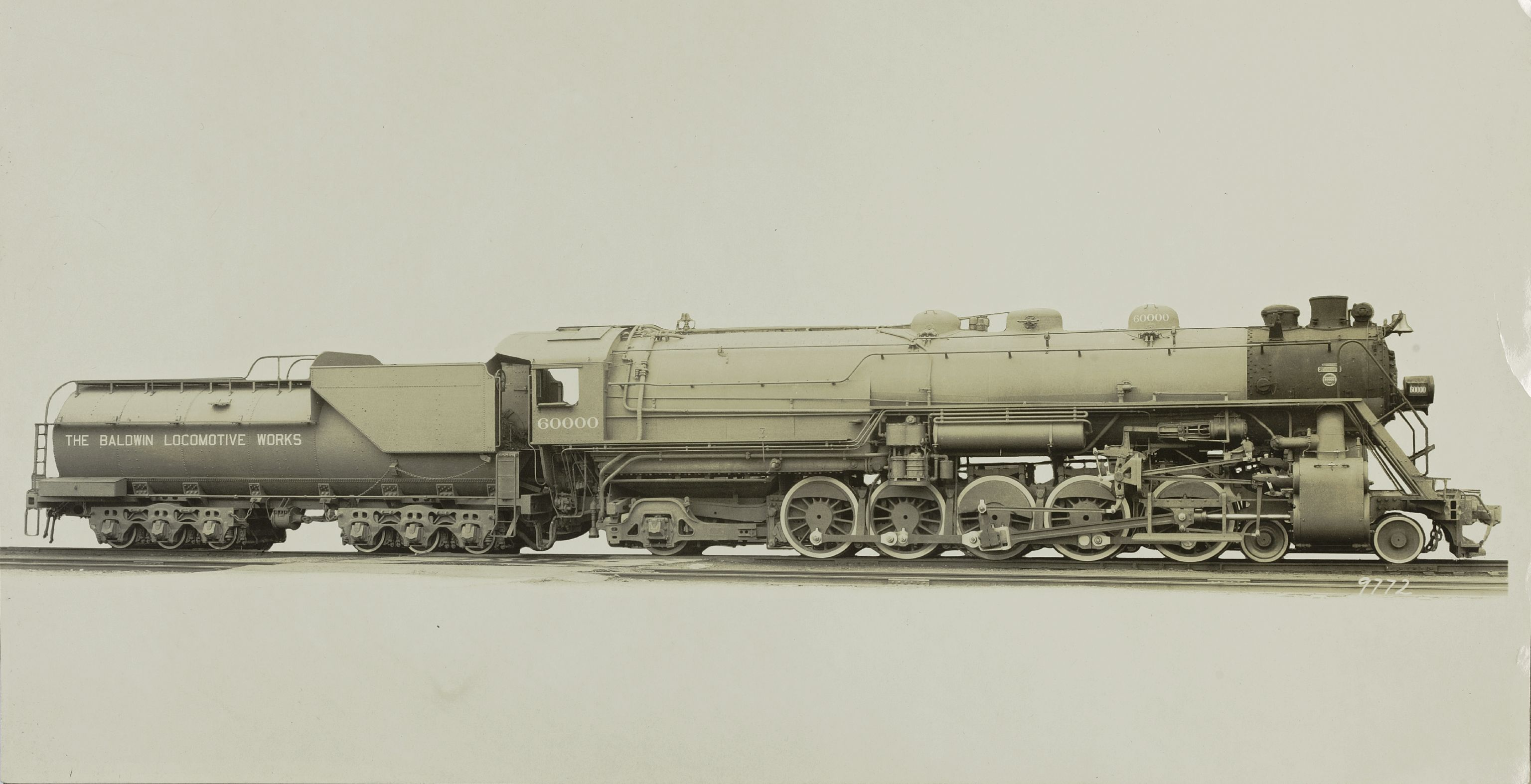
No. 60000's builders photo, 1926

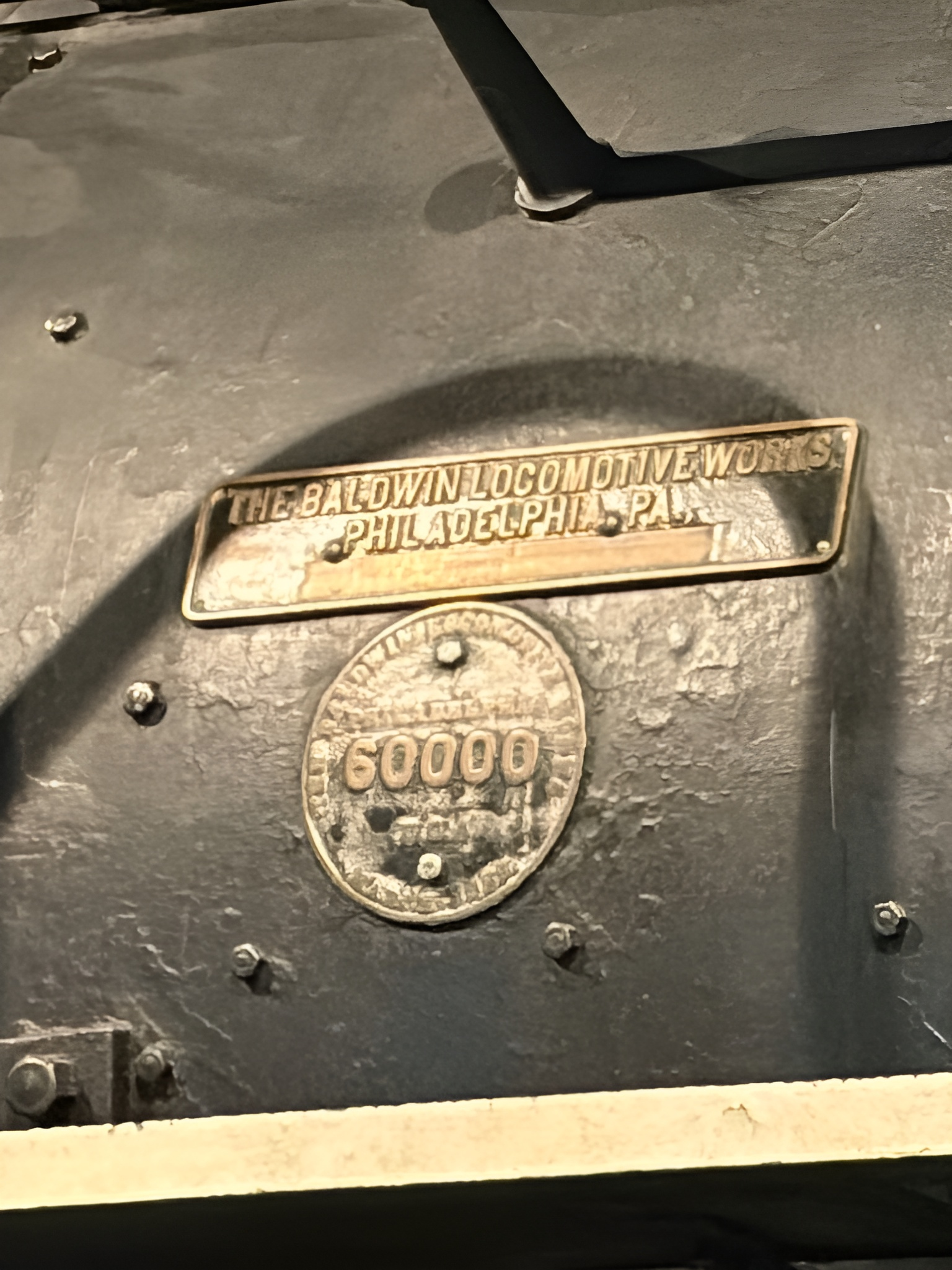
No. 60000's builders plate

After a series of brief test runs following construction, the 60000 was sent to the Pennsylvania Railroad's Altoona Test Plant in Altoona, Pennsylvania. Placed on rollers without its tender, it was tested on the traction dynamometer to measure its performance, which included maximum drawbar horsepower. Following tests at the Altoona Test Plant, the Pennsylvania Railroad placed the engine in freight service between Enola Yard near Harrisburg and Morrisville Yard via the Trenton Cutoff. During testing on the PRR, 60000 pulled a maximum of 7,700 tons.

Following testing on the PRR, the 60000 was sent for additional testing on the Baltimore and Ohio Railroad. Between November and December 1926, the 60000 was tested on the Cumberland Division between Brunswick and Keyser, Maryland, the Connellsville Division between Cumberland, Maryland, and Connellsville, Pennsylvania, and the Pittsburgh Division, which included the Sand Patch and Seventeen-Mile grades.

In February 1927, the 60000 was sent to the Chicago, Burlington and Quincy Railroad's Beardstown Division of Illinois. The 60000 was run in tandem with the CB&Q's own M2-A Class 2-10-2 number 6157, in order to compare coal and water consumption. Overall, the 60000 was superior in its coal and water consumption.

On 24 February 1927, the 60000 was sent to the Atchison, Topeka and Santa Fe Railroad. Testing was performed on the Pecos division between Clovis and Belen, New Mexico. As with the CB&Q, the AT&SF compared the performance of the 60000 with that of its own power in the form of two 3800-Class 2-10-2s. Once more the 60000 demonstrated superior fuel consumption than the locomotives of the host railroad.

In the summer and fall of 1927, the 60000 was sent to the Southern Pacific Railroad, which overhauled the locomotive and converted it to an oil burner at its Sacramento Shops. Following its conversion, the 60000 was tested in both freight and passenger service on the Sacramento Division, during which the engine carried a Southern Pacific tender. Following tests on the SP, the 60000 was sent to the Great Northern Railway between Everett, Washington and Minot, North Dakota. Overall, the 60000 did not perform as well on oil as it did on coal.

Converted back to coal, the 60000 was then returned to the Baldwin Locomotive Works and used as a stationary boiler before being donated to the Franklin Institute. The locomotive was moved from the Baltimore and Ohio Railroad tracks at 24th and Vine Street over temporary tracks to the museum building which was then still under construction. The locomotive was placed in the building through an opening in the western wall.
