= South African Class H2 4-8-2T =

1909 design of steam locomotive

NGR Class C 4-8-2T South African Class H2 4-8-2T
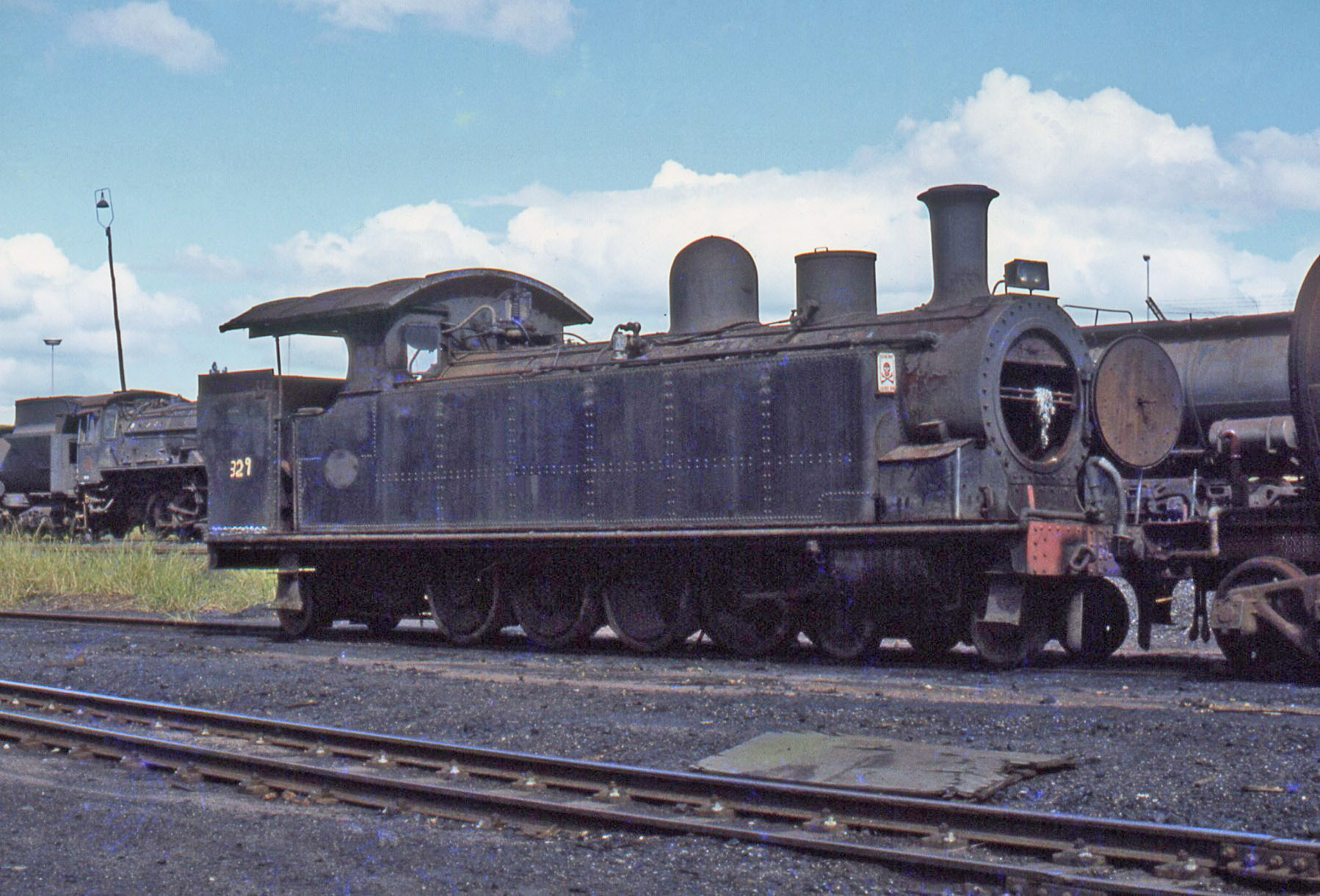
- Class H2 no. 329 at Masons Mill, 29 March 1979; Ex NGR Class C 4-10-2T no. 157; Ex SAR Class H 4-10-2T no. 240
Type and origin
- Power type: Steam
- Designer: Natal Government Railways (G.W. Reid)
- Builder: Dübs and Company; Natal Government Railways; South African Railways
- Serial number: Dübs 4047, 4060, 4063, 4117, 4271, 4273, 4315, 4325
- Model: NGR Reid Tenwheeler
- Build date: c. 1909-1912
- Total produced: 8
Specifications
- Configuration
  - Whyte: 4-8-2T (Mountain)
  - UIC: 2'D1'n2t
- Driver: 2nd coupled axle
- Gauge: 3 ft 6 in (1,067 mm) Cape gauge
- Leading dia.: 25 3/4 in (650 mm)
- Coupled dia.: 45 in (1,100 mm)
- Trailing dia.: 25 3/4 in (650 mm)
- Minimum curve: 300 ft (91 m) radius
- Wheelbase: 30 ft 6 in (9,296 mm)
  - Leading: 5 ft 4 in (1,626 mm)
  - Coupled: 12 ft 6 in (3,810 mm)
- Length
  - Over couplers: 37 ft 6 in (11,430 mm)
- Height: 12 ft 6 in (3,810 mm)
- Axle load: 13 LT (13,210 kg)
  - Leading: 10 LT 4 cwt 2 qtr (10,390 kg)
  - Coupled: 13 LT (13,210 kg)
  - Trailing: 6 LT (6,096 kg)
- Adhesive weight: 52 LT (52,830 kg)
- Loco weight: 68 LT (69,090 kg)
- Fuel type: Coal
- Fuel capacity: 4 LT (4.1 t)
- Water cap.: 1,880 imp gal (8,550 L)
- Firebox
  - Type: Round-top
  - Grate area: 21 sq ft (2.0 m^{2})
- Boiler
  - Pitch: 6 ft 10 in (2,083 mm)
  - Diameter: 4 ft 7 7/8 in (1,419 mm)
  - Tube plates: 10 ft 4 in (3,150 mm)
  - Small tubes: 287: 1 3/4 in (44 mm)
- Boiler pressure: 175 psi (1,207 kPa)
- Safety valve: Ramsbottom
- Heating surface
  - Firebox: 135 sq ft (12.5 m^{2})
  - Tubes: 1,359 sq ft (126.3 m^{2})
  - Total surface: 1,494 sq ft (138.8 m^{2})
- Cylinders: Two
- Cylinder size: 19 in (483 mm) bore 27 in (686 mm) stroke
- Valve gear: Allan
- Couplers: Johnston link-and-pin AAR knuckle (1930s)
Performance figures
- Tractive effort: 28,430 lbf (126.5 kN) @ 75%
Career
- Operators: Natal Government Railways; South African Railways
- Class: NGR Class C, SAR Class H2
- Number in class: 8
- Numbers: NGR 170, 173, 175, 217 & 240; SAR 227-231, 329-331
- Delivered: c. 1909-1912
- First run: 1909
- Withdrawn: 1977
- The leading coupled axle had flangeless wheels

The South African Railways Class H2 4-8-2T of 1909 was a steam locomotive from the pre-Union era in the Colony of Natal.

Between 1899 and 1903, the Natal Government Railways placed 101 4-10-2 tank steam locomotives in service. By 1910, five of them had been converted to a 4-8-2T wheel arrangement and in 1912, when the South African Railways classification and renumbering of locomotives took place, these five were designated Class H2.

== Origin ==
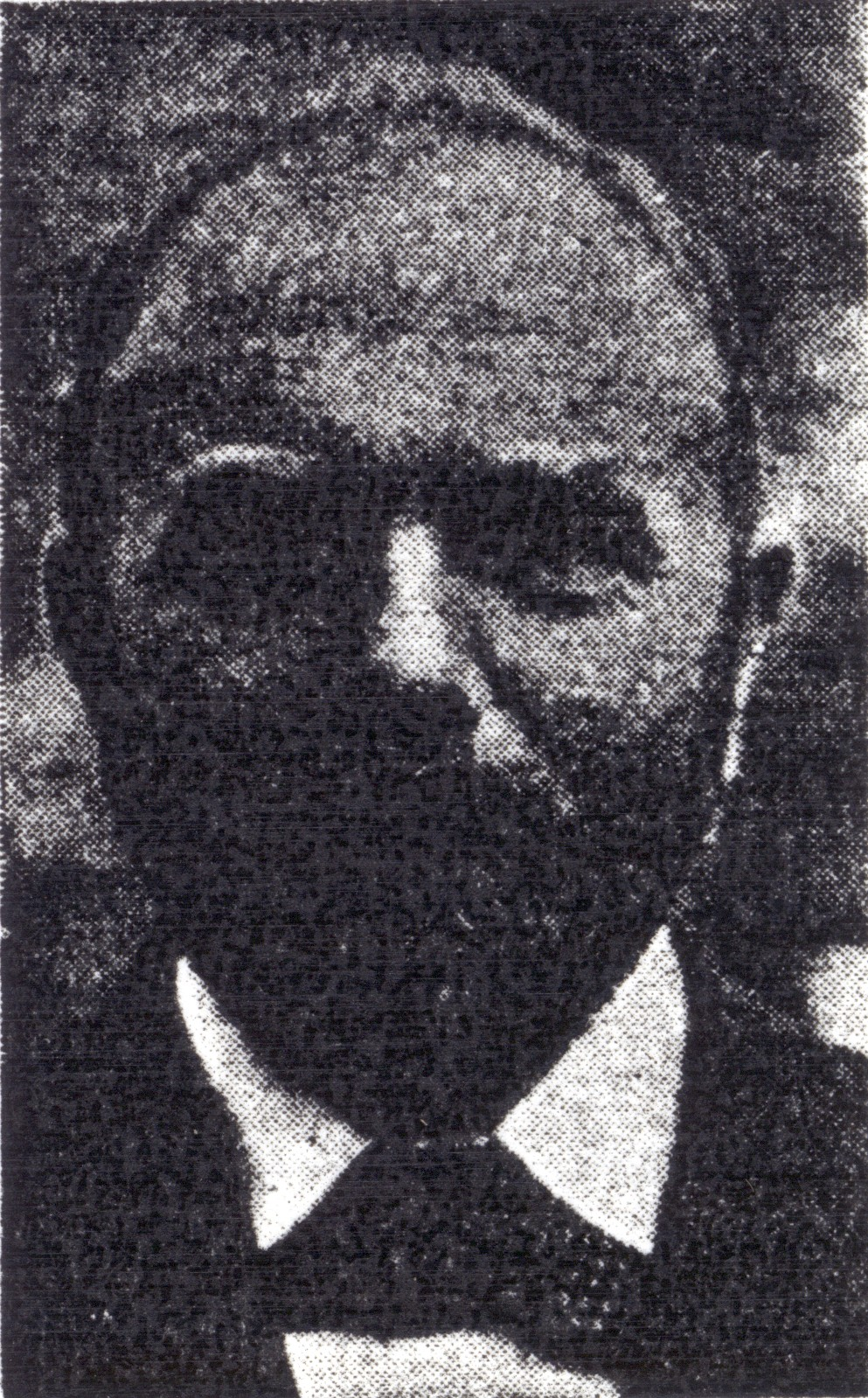
G.W. Reid

The requirement for a tank locomotive which could haul at least one-and-a-half times as much as a Dübs A 4-8-2T locomotive on the mainline of the Natal Government Railways (NGR) resulted in the design of a 4-10-2 tank locomotive by NGR Locomotive Superintendent G.W. Reid. Altogether 101 of these locomotives were built by Dübs and Company and North British Locomotive Company, delivered between 1899 and 1903 and numbered in the range from 149 to 249.

On the NGR, the locomotive type became known as the Reid Tenwheeler, until a classification system was introduced in 1905 or 1906 and they were designated the NGR Class C.

== Modification ==
When the Reid Tenwheelers began to be withdrawn from mainline service and placed in branch line and shunting service where smaller radius curves were encountered, it was found that the ten-coupled wheelbase was prone to derailment in many goods yards. By the end of 1908, these locomotives were all still shown on the NGR roster as 4-10-2T locomotives, but from c. 1909 some of them were gradually converted to a 4-8-2T wheel arrangement by removing the fifth set of coupled wheels and blanking off the resulting opening in the frame.

== South African Railways ==
When the Union of South Africa was established on 31 May 1910, the three Colonial government railways (Cape Government Railways, NGR and Central South African Railways) were united under a single administration to control and administer the railways, ports and harbours of the Union. Although the South African Railways and Harbours came into existence in 1910, the actual classification and renumbering of all the rolling stock of the three constituent railways were only implemented with effect from 1 January 1912.

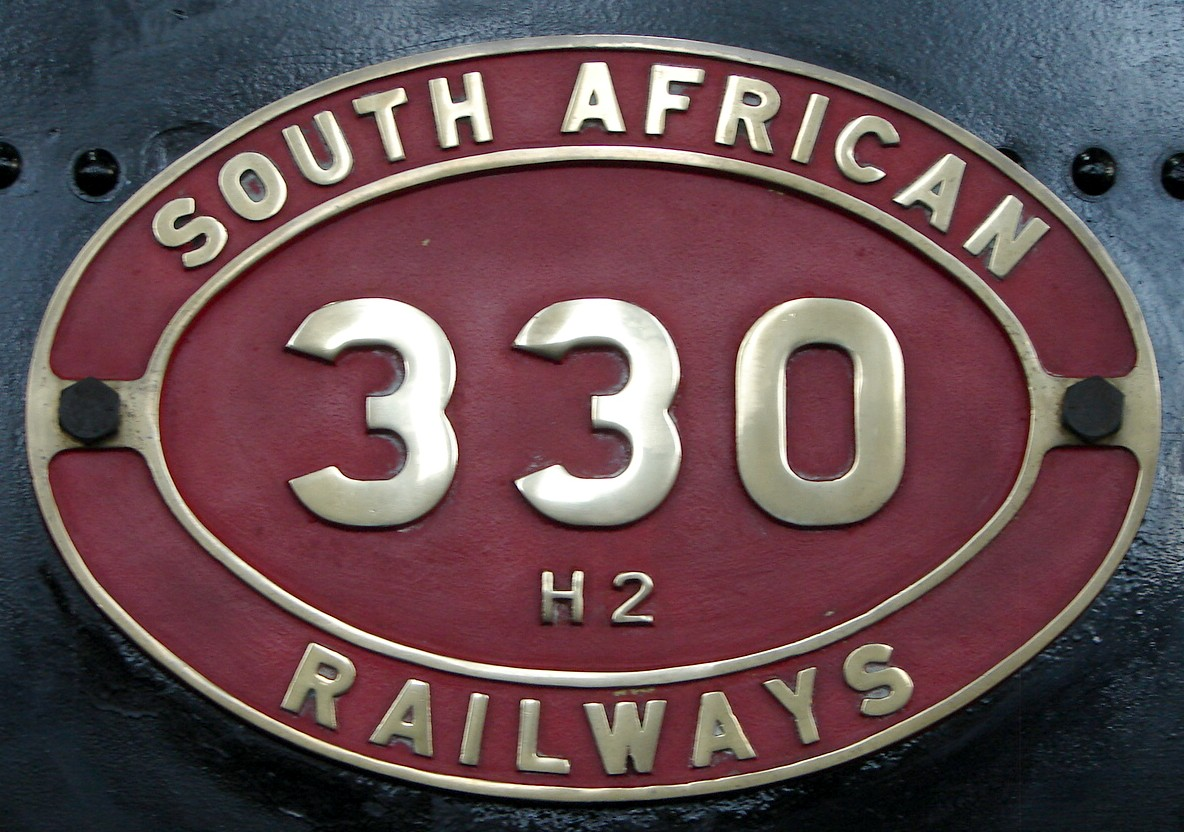

By 1912, five locomotives had already been modified to a 4-8-2T wheel arrangement. These were NGR numbers 170, 173, 175, 217 and 240, all built by Dübs between 1901 and 1903. They were designated Class H2 and were renumbered in the range from 227 to 231 on the South African Railways (SAR) roster.

Of the remaining 96 unmodified 4-10-2T Reid Tenwheelers, three had already been scrapped by 1912. The rest were designated Class H and were renumbered in the range from 232 to 324 on the SAR roster.

After 1912, these Class H locomotives were gradually also modified to a 4-8-2T wheel arrangement. The first three to be modified after being rostered in SAR service, numbers 240, 294 and 305, were reclassified to Class H2 as well and were renumbered once again, to 329, 330 and 331 respectively. The rest retained their Class H numbers after modification and reclassification.

== Service ==
The Class H2 was employed extensively in shunting service in many parts of the country, together with the Class H1. By 1964, however, the only large tank engines still active on the SAR were fourteen of the Class H2s and one Class H1. The Class H2s were all allocated to Greyville Loco Depot in Natal, where they were used on station pilot duties at Durban and to shunt in the harbour.

Because of their light axle loading, the last ones to remain in service were retained for use on the Bluff in Durban until 1977, more than three-quarters of a century after they entered service. The main reason for their longevity was that, until the arrival of Class 36-000 diesel-electric shunting engines earlier in 1975, the H2's were the only locomotives able to pass beneath the staithes of the aged Bluff coaling appliance at Wests and up to four or five of them were rostered for this work at any time. Two of the Class H2s, numbers 329 and 330, were retained in service at Greyville Loco Depot, mainly to shunt the coal stage, until its eventual closure in September 1976.

== Preservation ==
Three H2s have been preserved.

+ H2 249 at the Witbank Loco Depot.

+ H2 314 at the Hilton Preservation Centre.

+ H2 330 at the Outeniqua Transport Museum.

== Works numbers ==
The builders, works numbers and new numbers of the eight renumbered Class H2 locomotives are listed in the table.

Class H2 4-8-2T Builders, works numbers and renumbering
Year	Builder	Works no.	NGR no.	Class H no.	Class H2 no.
1901	Dübs	4060	170		227
1901	Dübs	4063	173		228
1902	Dübs	4117	175		229
1902	Dübs	4271	217		230
1903	Dübs	4325	240		231
1901	Dübs	4047	157	240	329
1902	Dübs	4273	219	294	330
1903	Dübs	4315	230	305	331

== Illustration ==
The main picture shows the retired Class H2 no. 329, ex NGR no. 157, one of the first three Reid Tenwheelers to be modified to a 4-8-2T Class H2 after having originally being taken onto the SAR roster as an unmodified 4-10-2T Class H, no. 240. It was earmarked for preservation and photographed on 29 March 1979, staged at Masons Mill in Pietermaritzburg.

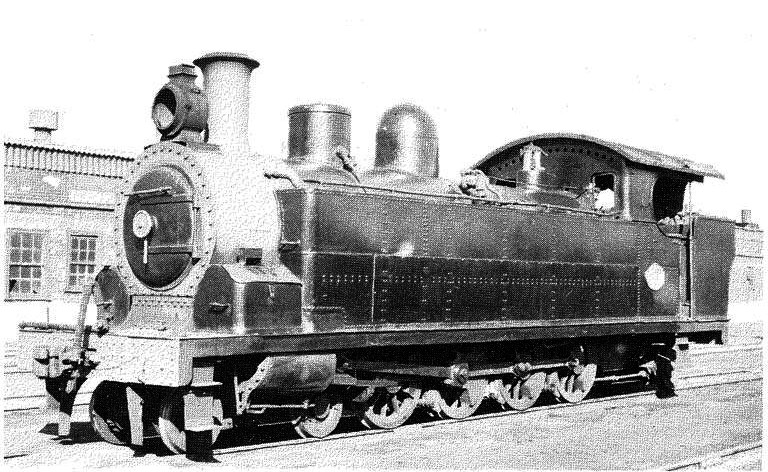
Class H2 4-8-2T, ex NGR Class C 4-8-2T modified Reid Tenwheeler, c. 1950

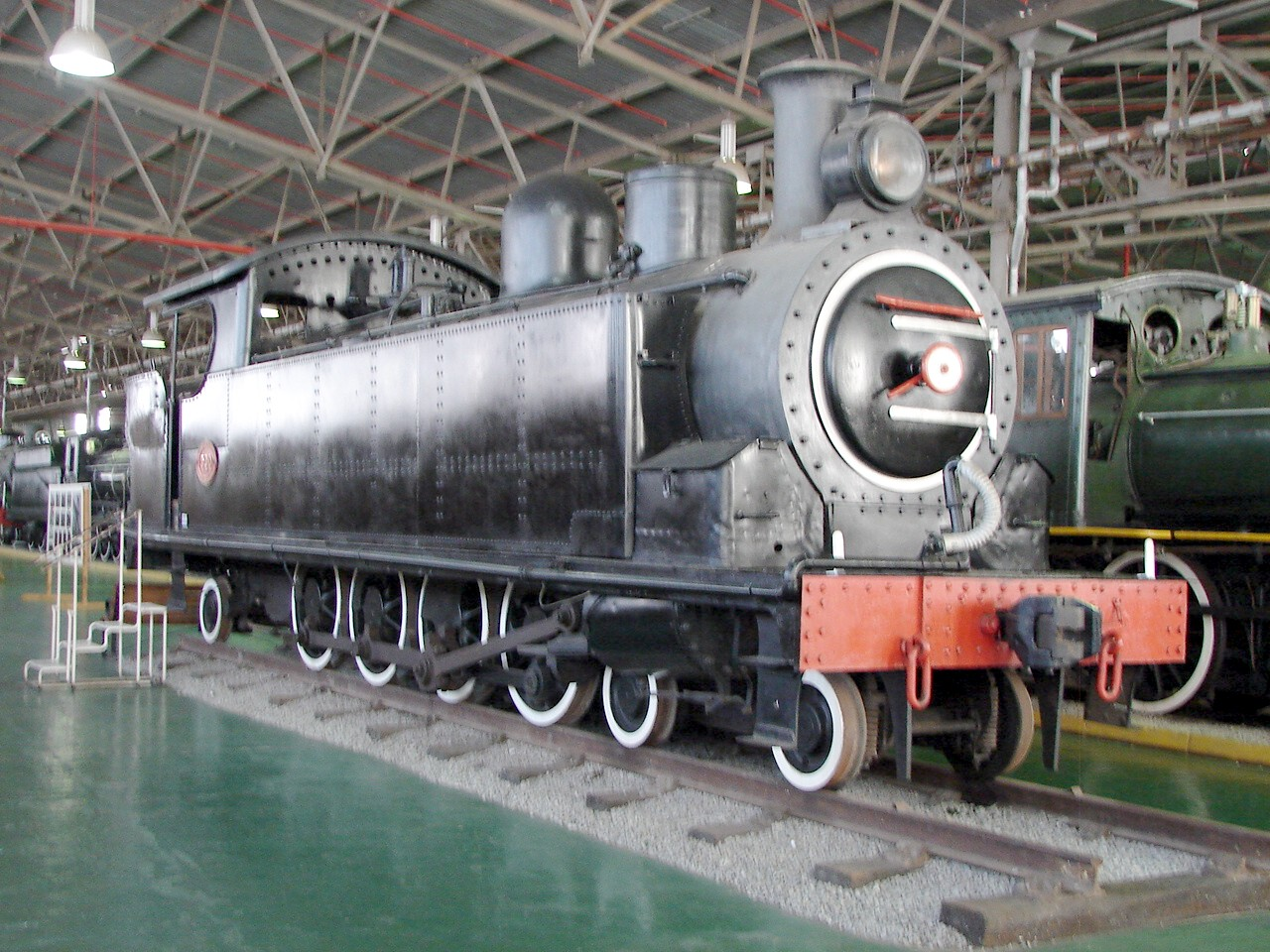
Class H2 no. 330 at the Outeniqua Transport Museum, 15 April 2013

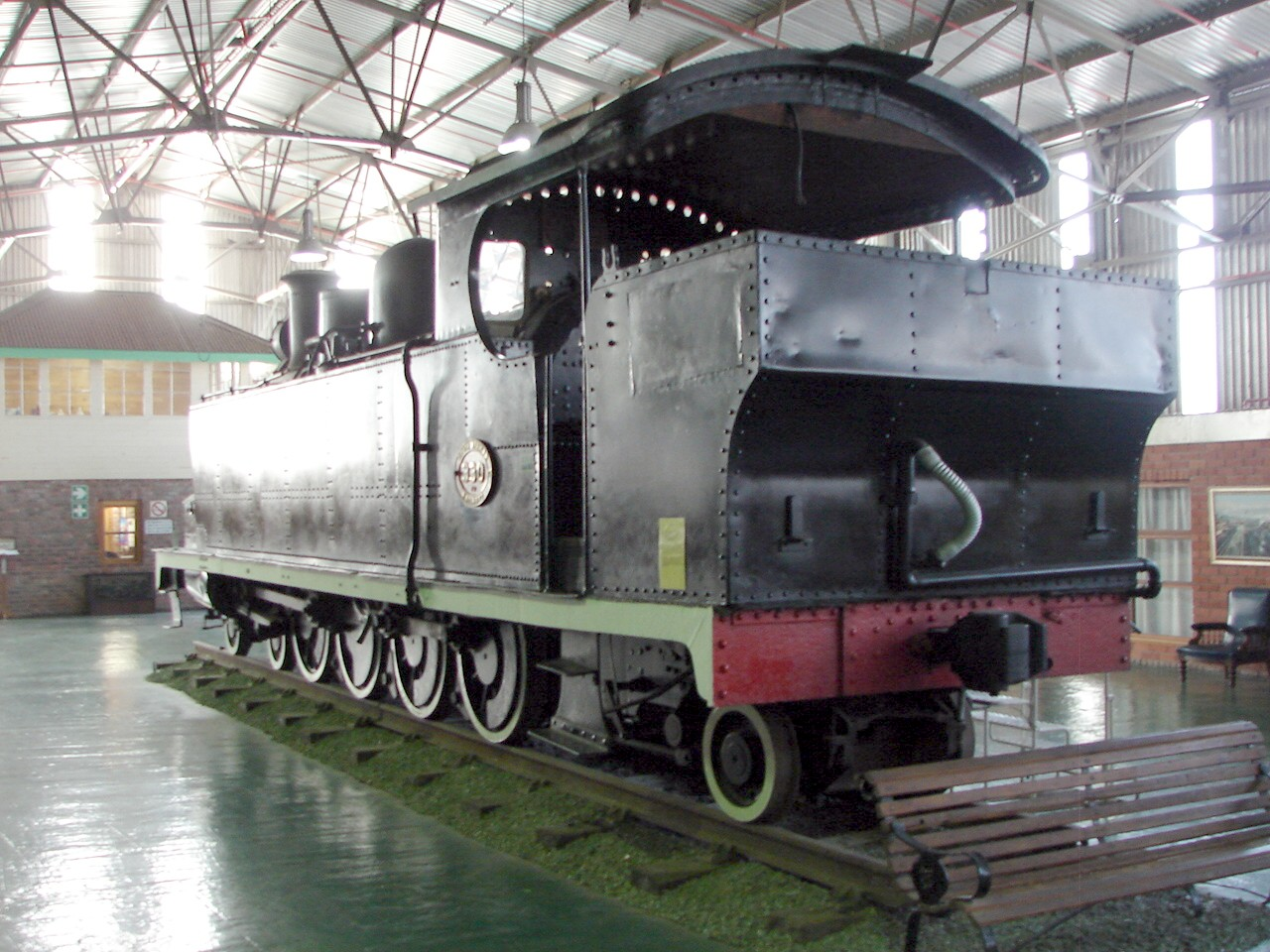
Class H2 no. 330 at the Outeniqua Transport Museum, 15 April 2013
