= South African Class 13 4-8-0TT =

1905 design of steam locomotive

CSAR Class E 4-8-0TT South African Class 13 4-8-0TT
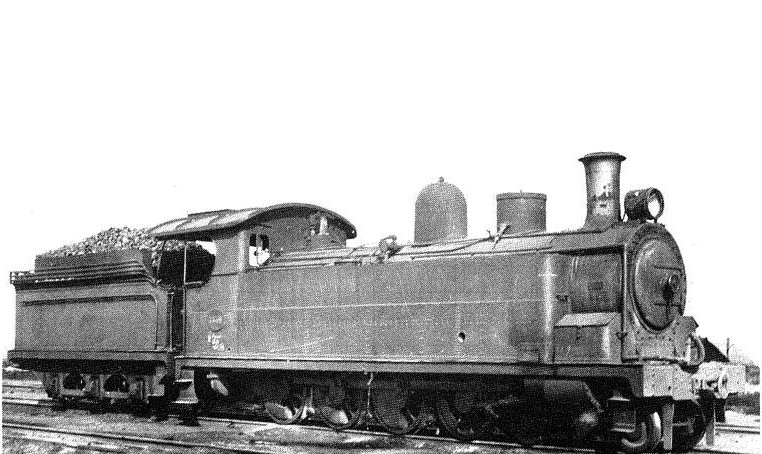
- SAR Class 13, c. 1912
Type and origin
- Power type: Steam
- Designer: Natal Government Railways (G.W. Reid)
- Builder: Dübs and Company; Neilson, Reid and Company; Central South African Railways
- Serial number: Dübs 4086-4087, 4089-4098; Neilson, Reid 6197-6205, 6207-6212, 6214-6215
- Model: Converted Reid Tenwheeler
- Build date: 1904
- Total produced: 29
Specifications
- Configuration
  - Whyte: 4-8-0TT (Mastodon)
  - UIC: 2'Dn2t
- Driver: 2nd coupled axle
- Gauge: 3 ft 6 in (1,067 mm) Cape gauge
- Leading dia.: 25 3/4 in (654 mm)
- Coupled dia.: 45 in (1,143 mm)
- Wheelbase: 43 ft 1/2 in (13,119 mm)
  - Engine: 21 ft 4 in (6,502 mm)
  - Leading: 5 ft 4 in (1,626 mm)
  - Coupled: 12 ft 6 in (3,810 mm)
- Length
  - Over couplers: 50 ft 8 1/4 in (15,450 mm)
- Height: 12 ft 6 in (3,810 mm)
- Frame type: Plate
- Axle load: 13 LT 16 cwt (14,020 kg)
  - Leading: 8 LT 17 cwt (8,992 kg)
  - 1st coupled: 12 LT 7 cwt (12,550 kg)
  - 2nd coupled: 12 LT 16 cwt (13,010 kg)
  - 3rd coupled: 12 LT 16 cwt (13,010 kg)
  - 4th coupled: 13 LT 16 cwt (14,020 kg)
- Adhesive weight: 51 LT 15 cwt (52,580 kg)
- Loco weight: 60 LT 12 cwt (61,570 kg)
- Tender type: 3-axle or 2-axle bogies
- Fuel type: Coal
- Water cap.: 1,880 imp gal (8,550 L) engine
- Firebox
  - Type: Round-top
  - Grate area: 21 sq ft (2.0 m^{2})
- Boiler
  - Pitch: 6 ft 10 in (2,083 mm)
  - Diameter: 4 ft 7 7/8 in (1,419 mm)
  - Tube plates: 10 ft 4 in (3,150 mm)
  - Small tubes: 287: 1 3/4 in (44 mm)
- Boiler pressure: 175 psi (1,207 kPa)
- Safety valve: Ramsbottom
- Heating surface
  - Firebox: 135 sq ft (12.5 m^{2})
  - Tubes: 1,359 sq ft (126.3 m^{2})
  - Total surface: 1,494 sq ft (138.8 m^{2})
- Cylinders: Two
- Cylinder size: 19 in (483 mm) bore 27 in (686 mm) stroke
- Valve gear: Allan
- Couplers: Johnston link-and-pin AAR knuckle (1930s)
Performance figures
- Tractive effort: 28,430 lbf (126.5 kN) @ 75%
Career
- Operators: Imperial Military Railways; Central South African Railways; South African Railways
- Class: CSAR Class E, SAR Class 13
- Number in class: 29
- Numbers: 1310–1338
- Nicknames: Walloper
- Delivered: 1904
- First run: 1904
- Withdrawn: 1961
- The leading coupled axle had flangeless wheels

The South African Railways Class 13 4-8-0TT of 1905 was a steam locomotive from the pre-Union era in Transvaal.

In 1902, towards the end of the Second Boer War, the Imperial Military Railways placed 35 4-10-2 tank locomotives in service, built to the specifications of the Reid Tenwheeler of the Natal Government Railways. At the end of the war, these locomotives came onto the roster of the Central South African Railways and were designated Class E. All but six of them were subsequently converted to 4-8-0 tank-and-tender locomotives. In 1912, when these converted locomotives came onto the South African Railways roster, they were designated Class 13.

== Manufacturers ==
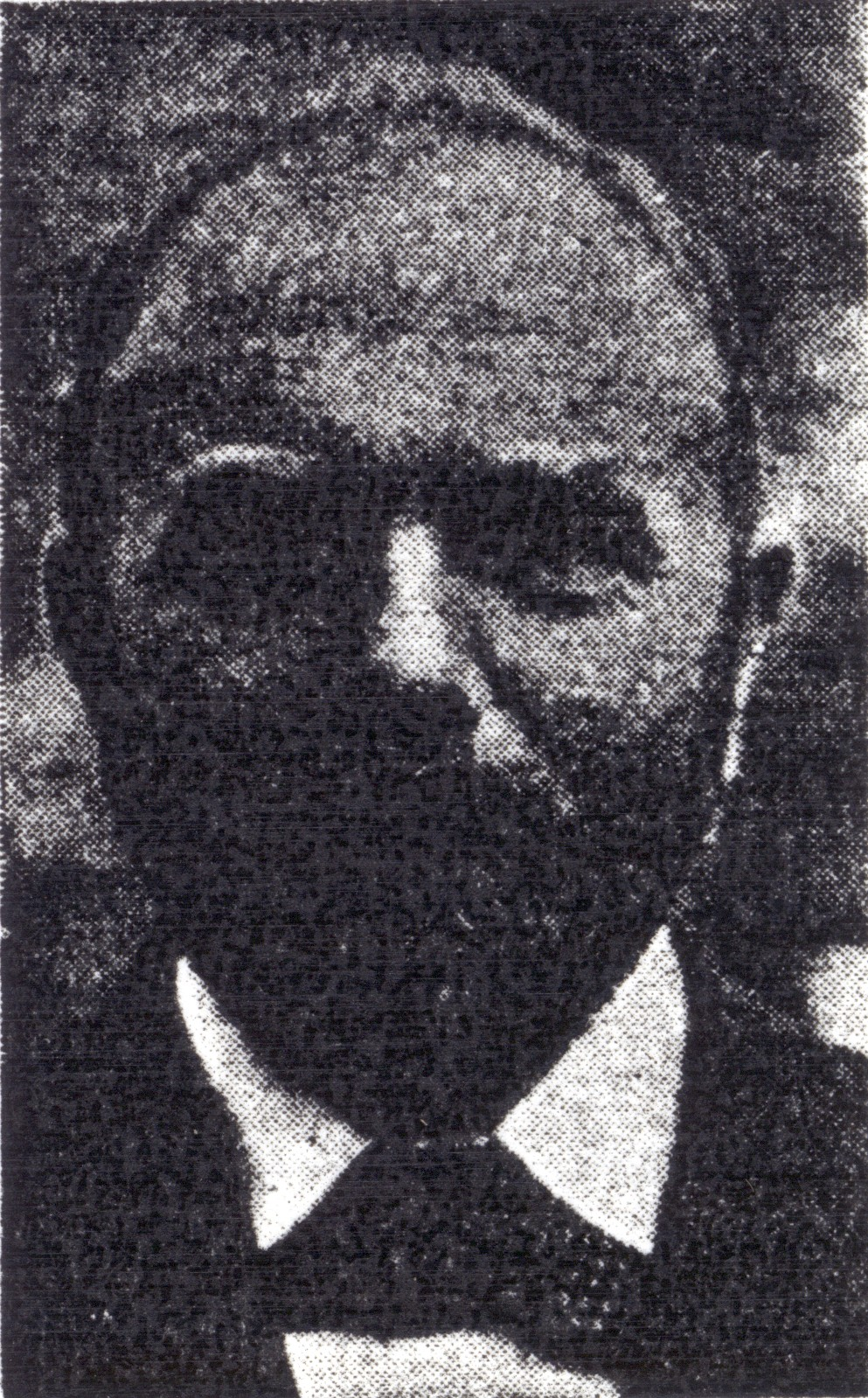
G.W. Reid

The requirement for a tank locomotive which could haul at least one-and-a-half times as much as a Dübs A 4-8-2T locomotive on the Natal Government Railways (NGR) mainline, resulted in the design of a 4-10-2 tank locomotive by George W. Reid, Locomotive Superintendent of the NGR at the end of the 19th century. On the NGR, the locomotive type became known as the Reid Tenwheeler, later designated the NGR Class C.

In 1902, during the Second Boer War, the Imperial Military Railways (IMR) placed orders for 35 locomotives of the NGR's Reid Tenwheeler type. To ensure rapid delivery, the order was split between Dübs and Company, who delivered the locomotives in the number range from 220 to 234, and Neilson, Reid and Company, who delivered the locomotives in the number range from 235 to 254, all in 1902.

== Service ==
=== Imperial Military Railways ===
In comparison to the NGR version, the IMR locomotives were more ornate. In true military tradition, the domes, chimney caps and boiler bands were of polished brass. A weatherboard was affixed to the coal bunker to offer better protection to the crew while travelling bunker forward. The practice of polished brasswork was followed on all new IMR locomotives and was continued even after the railways became the Central South African Railways (CSAR) at the end of the war.

=== Central South African Railways ===
After the war, the Reid Tenwheeler locomotives were designated Class E on the CSAR. P.A. Hyde, Chief Locomotive Superintendent of the CSAR, found them to have an inadequate coal and water supply for trips of any length and decided to convert 29 of them to 4-8-0 Mastodon type tank-and-tender engines, beginning in 1904. The trailing bissel bogie, the fifth pair of coupled wheels and the coal bunker were removed, the main frame was shortened and three- or four-axle tenders from various withdrawn or obsolete locomotives were attached. This increased the coal and water capacities which resulted in a considerable increase in the operating range of the locomotive. Since it was now able to be used without a water tank attached, it could still haul the same load as before, used less oil and was no longer prone to derailment while reversing. Crews found the locomotive more comfortable to work than the tank version.

=== South African Railways ===
When the Union of South Africa was established on 31 May 1910, the three Colonial government railways (Cape Government Railways, NGR and CSAR) were united under a single administration to control and administer the railways, ports and harbours of the Union. Although the South African Railways and Harbours came into existence in 1910, the actual classification and renumbering of all the rolling stock of the three constituent railways were only implemented with effect from 1 January 1912.

In 1912, these locomotives were designated Class 13 on the South African Railways (SAR) and renumbered in the range from 1310 to 1338. The Class 13 was used for a variety of minor tasks, almost exclusively in the Witwatersrand area. They were popular with their drivers and were nicknamed Wallopers. The last of the Class was withdrawn in 1961.

=== Industrial ===
After withdrawal, several were sold to South African mines, where some were modified once again. A few of them remained in service on the mines well into the 1980s.

== Works numbers ==
The builders, works numbers, rebuilding and renumbering of all 35 original 4-10-2T locomotives are listed in the table.

CSAR Class E Rebuilt Reid Tenwheelers
CSAR No.	Builder	Works No.	Rebuilt to	SAR No.
220	Dübs	4086	Class 13	1310
221	Dübs	4087	Class 13	1311
222	Dübs	4088	Class H1	222
223	Dübs	4089	Class 13	1312
224	Dübs	4090	Class 13	1313
225	Dübs	4091	Class 13	1314
226	Dübs	4092	Class 13	1315
227	Dübs	4093	Class 13	1316
228	Dübs	4094	Class 13	1317
229	Dübs	4095	Class 13	1318
230	Dübs	4096	Class 13	1319
231	Dübs	4097	Class 13	1320
232	Dübs	4098	Class 13	1321
233	Dübs	4099	Class H1	223
234	Dübs	4100	Class H1	
235	Neilson Reid	6196	Class H1	224
236	Neilson Reid	6197	Class 13	1322
237	Neilson Reid	6198	Class 13	1323
238	Neilson Reid	6199	Class 13	1324
239	Neilson Reid	6200	Class 13	1325
240	Neilson Reid	6201	Class 13	1326
241	Neilson Reid	6202	Class 13	1327
242	Neilson Reid	6203	Class 13	1328
243	Neilson Reid	6204	Class 13	1329
244	Neilson Reid	6205	Class 13	1330
245	Neilson Reid	6206	Class H1	225
246	Neilson Reid	6207	Class 13	1331
247	Neilson Reid	6208	Class 13	1332
248	Neilson Reid	6209	Class 13	1333
249	Neilson Reid	6210	Class 13	1334
250	Neilson Reid	6211	Class 13	1335
251	Neilson Reid	6212	Class 13	1336
252	Neilson Reid	6213	Class H1	226
253	Neilson Reid	6214	Class 13	1337
254	Neilson Reid	6215	Class 13	1338

== Illustration ==
One of these locomotives, SAR no. 1313, warrants special mention, having served in four different configurations. It started out on the IMR as a 4-10-2T Reid Tenwheeler type and was then converted by the CSAR, first to a 4-8-2T Mountain type and then to a 4-8-0TT Mastodon type, before being inherited by the SAR. Finally, in mine service, its side tanks were removed to convert it to a regular 4-8-0 tender locomotive.

The main picture shows a Class 13 in tank-and-tender configuration, c. 1912. The following pictures show Class 13 no. 1337 with its side tanks removed to convert it to a regular 4-8-0 configuration while in mine service.

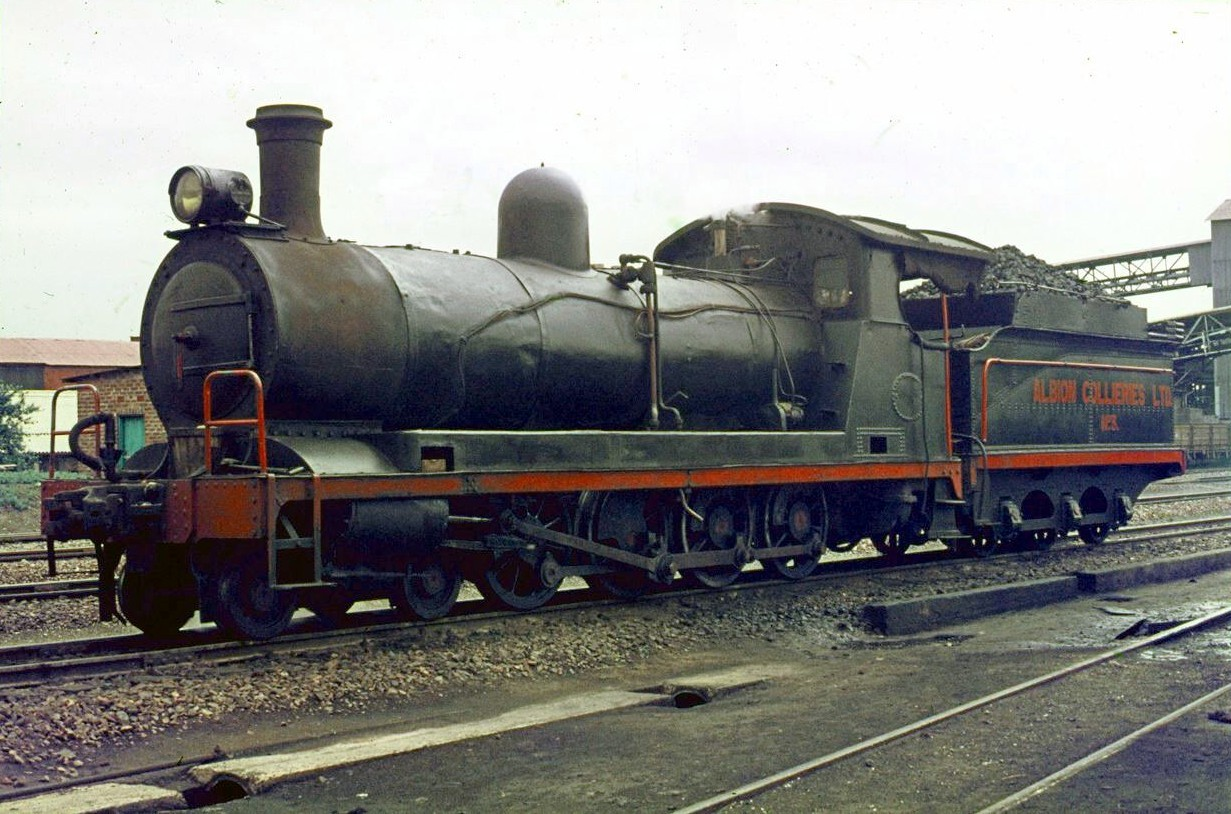
No. 1337 in service at Albion Colliery as no. 1, 6 November 1974

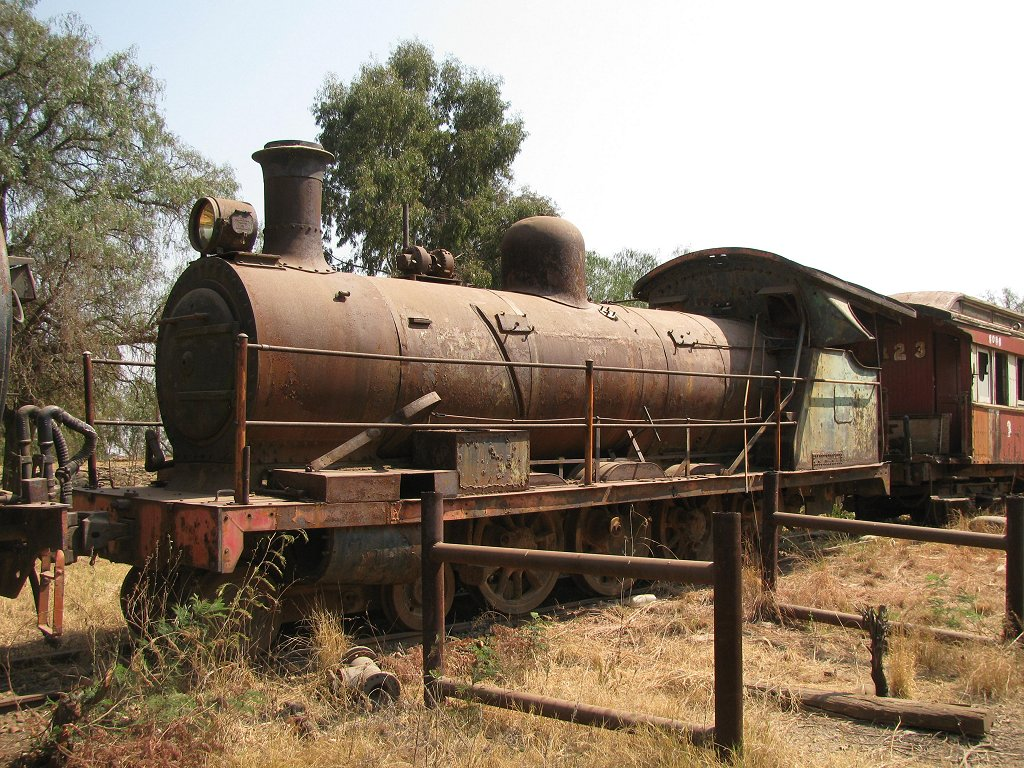
No. 1337 at SANRASM, 10 September 2010
