= South African Class H 4-10-2T =

1899 design of steam locomotive

NGR Class C 4-10-2T South African Class H 4-10-2T
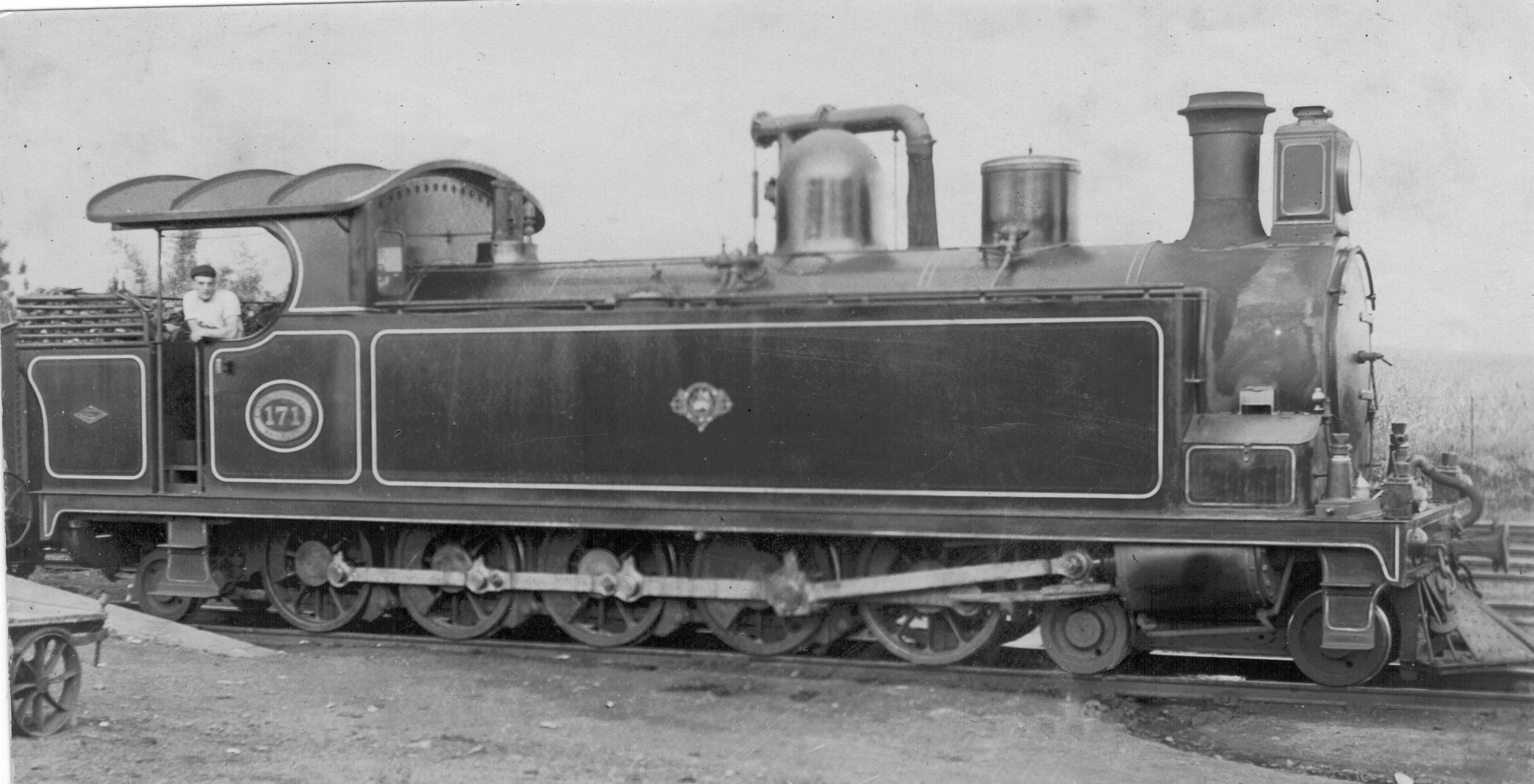
- NGR Class C no. 171 c. 1903, SAR Class H no. 253
Type and origin
- Power type: Steam
- Designer: Natal Government Railways (G.W. Reid)
- Builder: Dübs and Company; North British Locomotive Company
- Serial number: Dübs 3835, 4040-4064, 4118-4141, 4254-4278, 4310-4329; NBL 15723-15727
- Build date: 1899–1903
- Total produced: 102
- Rebuilder: Natal Government Railways; South African Railways
- Rebuild date: c. 1910 onward
- Number rebuilt: 98 to 4-8-2T (Mountain)
Specifications
- Configuration
  - Whyte: 4-10-2T (Reid Tenwheeler)
  - UIC: 2'E1'n2t
- Driver: 2nd coupled axle
- Gauge: 3 ft 6 in (1,067 mm) Cape gauge
- Leading dia.: 25 3/4 in (654 mm)
- Coupled dia.: 45 in (1,143 mm)
- Trailing dia.: 25 3/4 in (654 mm)
- Minimum curve: 300 ft (91 m)
- Wheelbase: 30 ft 6 in (9,296 mm)
  - Leading: 5 ft 4 in (1,626 mm)
  - Coupled: 16 ft 8 in (5,080 mm)
- Length
  - Over couplers: 37 ft 6 in (11,430 mm)
- Height: 12 ft 6 in (3,810 mm)
- Frame type: Plate
- Axle load: 12 LT 5 cwt (12,450 kg)
  - Leading: 9 LT 17 cwt (10,010 kg)
  - 1st coupled: 10 LT 18 cwt (11,070 kg)
  - 2nd coupled: 12 LT 5 cwt (12,450 kg)
  - 3rd coupled: 10 LT 13 cwt (10,820 kg)
  - 4th coupled: 10 LT 10 cwt (10,670 kg)
  - 5th coupled: 10 LT 10 cwt (10,670 kg)
  - Trailing: 4 LT 4 cwt (4,267 kg)
- Adhesive weight: 54 LT 16 cwt (55,680 kg)
- Loco weight: 68 LT 17 cwt (69,950 kg)
- Fuel type: Coal
- Fuel capacity: 4 LT (4.1 t)
- Water cap.: 1,880 imp gal (8,550 L)
- Firebox
  - Type: Round-top
  - Grate area: 21.15 sq ft (1.965 m^{2})
- Boiler
  - Pitch: 6 ft 10 in (2,083 mm)
  - Diameter: 4 ft 7 7/8 in (1,419 mm)
  - Tube plates: 10 ft 4 in (3,150 mm)
  - Small tubes: 287: 1 3/4 in (44 mm)
- Boiler pressure: 175 psi (1,207 kPa)
- Safety valve: Salter & Ramsbottom
- Heating surface
  - Firebox: 134.79 sq ft (12.522 m^{2})
  - Tubes: 1,358.71 sq ft (126.228 m^{2})
  - Total surface: 1,493.50 sq ft (138.751 m^{2})
- Cylinders: Two
- Cylinder size: 19 in (483 mm) bore 27 in (686 mm) stroke
- Valve gear: Allan
- Valve type: Richardson balanced slide
- Couplers: Johnston link-and-pin
Performance figures
- Tractive effort: 28,440 lbf (126.5 kN) @ 75%
Career
- Operators: Natal Government Railways; South African Railways; Witbank Collieries
- Class: NGR Class C SAR Class H
- Number in class: NGR 101, SAR 93
- Numbers: NGR 149-249, SAR 232-324
- Official name: Reid Tenwheeler
- Nicknames: Walloper
- Delivered: 1899–1903
- First run: 1899
- Withdrawn: 1977
- The leading and trailing coupled axles had flangeless wheels

The South African Railways Class H 4-10-2T, introduced in 1899, was a steam locomotive from the pre-Union era in the Colony of Natal.

Between 1899 and 1903, the Natal Government Railways placed 101 tank steam locomotives with a 4-10-2 wheel arrangement in service. In 1912, after the establishment of the South African Railways, 93 of these Class C Reid Tenwheelers survived unmodified and were designated Class H.

== Design ==
By 1898, the new Natal Government Railways (NGR) experienced increasing traffic on the mainline into the interior. The route had sharp curves and severe 1 in 30 (3⅓%) gradients (i.e., for every 30 meters traveled, the track rose or fell by 1 meter). These obstacles necessitated double-heading of the NGR's Dübs A 4-8-2T locomotives on the heavier section of the Natal mainline between Estcourt and Mooirivier to run longer trains to reduce occupation of the line. The requirement therefore arose for a tank locomotive which could haul at least one-and-a-half times as much as a Dübs A locomotive.

The limitations within which G.W. Reid, Locomotive Superintendent of the NGR at the time, had to meet this requirement were rather severe. The maximum axle load was not to exceed 14 long tons (14,220 kilograms) within the construction loading gauge of 13 feet (3,962 millimetres) high by 9 feet (2,743 millimetres) wide, while the locomotive had to be able to negotiate gradients of 1 in 30 (3⅓%), compensated for curves of 300 feet (91 metres) radius. The result was Reid's design of a 4-10-2 tank engine, the first locomotive in the world to use this wheel arrangement.

== Manufacturers ==
Since there was no precedent for such an enormous Cape gauge tank locomotive, the design was the subject of some severe criticism and various objections were put forward against its introduction. It was therefore decided to order only one experimental locomotive from Dübs and Company. It was delivered in 1899 and numbered 149.

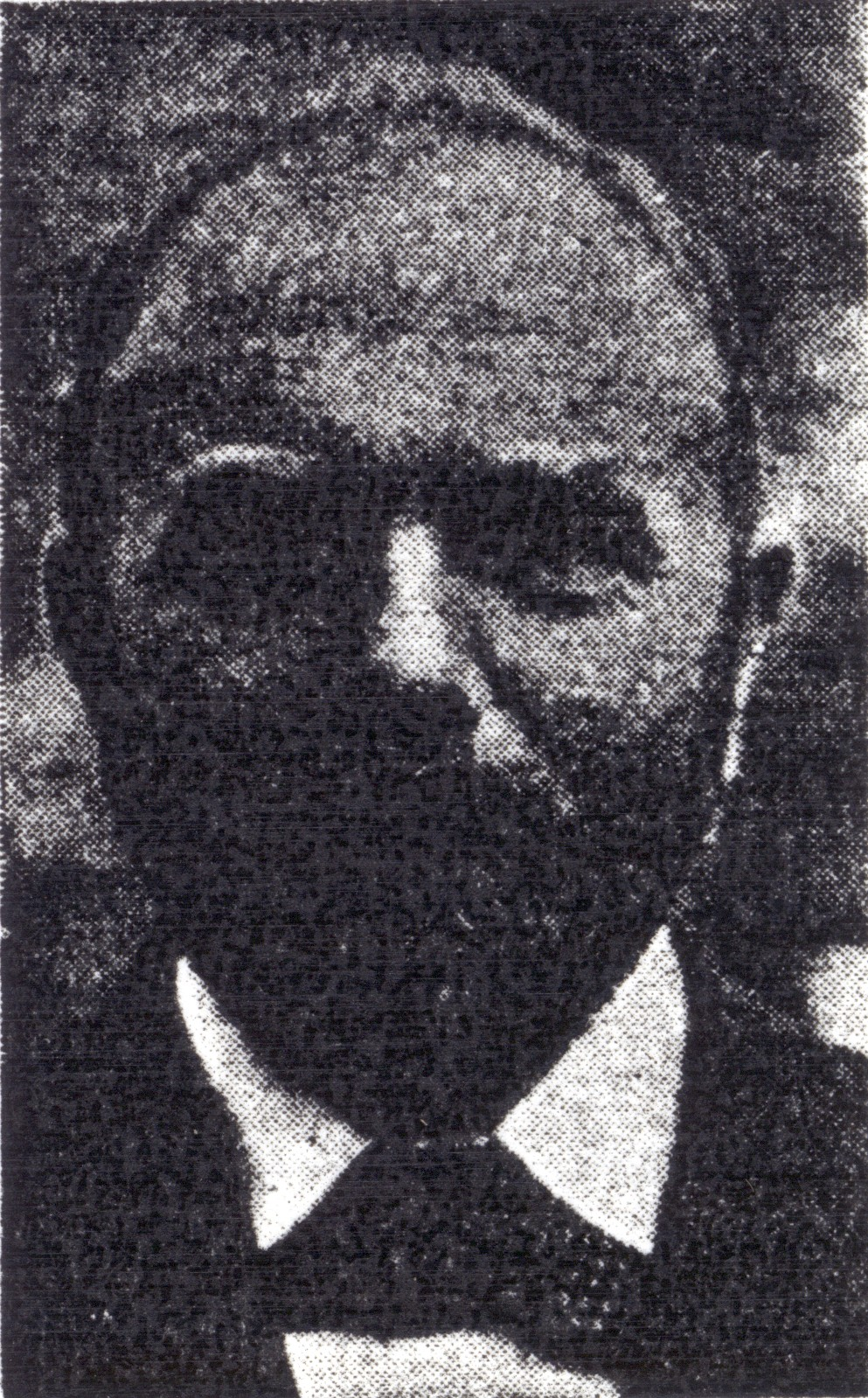
G.W. Reid

In 1900, the General Manager of the NGR reported that the trials of the 4-10-2T Reid locomotive had proven successful beyond anticipation and that the engine could haul a gross load of 200 long tons (203.2 tonnes) over the worst section of line with ease, 50% in excess of that taken by a Dübs A locomotive. As a result, orders were placed for another 100 of these locomotives between 1901 and 1903. The first 95 of these locomotives were built in four batches by Dübs and were numbered in the range from 150 to 244.

Since Dübs and a number of other Scottish locomotive builders were merged to form the North British Locomotive Company (NBL) while the locomotives were being built, the last five engines were delivered as having been built by the newly established NBL, numbered in the range from 245 to 249.

== Classification ==
On the NGR, the locomotive type became known as the Reid Tenwheeler. When a locomotive classification system was introduced on the NGR, they were designated Class C.

== Characteristics ==
To negotiate sharp curves, both the first and fifth pairs of coupled wheels were flangeless. The cylinders were arranged outside the plate frame, while the Richardson balanced type slide valves were placed between the frames. The locomotive used saturated steam and was equipped with Allan straight link valve gear, which was reversed by hand-wheel and quick screw gear. Allan valve gear was chosen chiefly because it required less space than the more usual Stephenson lifting link gear and was simpler in construction. The trailing Bissel truck was of the Cartazzi type which allowed the axle some lateral movement.

The leading bogie was controlled by two side-check springs and had 4 inches (102 millimetres) of side-play in each direction. This arrangement was later modified on some locomotives by substituting it with swing links. The portion of the driving crankpins for the connecting rod big-ends was turned 1 1/2 inches (38 millimetres) eccentric to that of the coupling rods to obtain the longest possible piston stroke which the wheel diameter would permit, while keeping the throw of the coupling rod to a reasonable amount. Since the piston rod and crosshead was forged in one piece, the connecting rod small-end had to be forked.

The firebox, at 8 feet 11 5/8 inches (2,734 millimetres) long and 2 feet 4 1/2 inches (724 millimetres) wide inside and arranged between the frames, was the longest ever used in South Africa.

== Modifications ==
The main shortcoming of the Reid Tenwheeler was a tendency to derail while reversing, particularly over points, since the trailing coupled wheels were flangeless and tended to drop off the rails in the 1 in 7 turnouts which were in use at the time. This was overcome by increasing the tyre width from 6 inches (152 millimetres) to 7 inches (178 millimetres), after which the locomotives proved successful in service.

When some were withdrawn from mainline service and placed in branch line and shunting service where smaller radius curves were encountered, they were modified to 4-8-2T locomotives by removing the fifth pair of coupled wheels.

== South African Railways ==
When the Union of South Africa was established on 31 May 1910, the three Colonial government railways (Cape Government Railways, NGR and Central South African Railways) were united under a single administration to control and administer the railways, ports and harbours of the Union. Although the South African Railways and Harbours came into existence in 1910, the actual classification and renumbering of all the rolling stock of the three constituent railways were only implemented with effect from 1 January 1912.

In 1912, the 93 as yet unmodified Class C Reid Tenwheelers were designated Class H on the South African Railways (SAR) and renumbered in the range from 232 to 324. The modified 4-8-2T engines, also designated NGR Class C, were designated Class H2 on the SAR and renumbered in the range from 227 to 231. Three locomotives, NGR numbers 194, 195 and 214, had been scrapped prior to 1912 and did not come under the renumbering scheme.

The SAR Class H locomotives were gradually also modified to a 4-8-2T wheel arrangement. The first three of these, SAR numbers 240, 294 and 305, were renumbered again to 329, 330 and 331 respectively, but the rest retained their Class H engine numbers after modification. Their builders, works numbers and renumbering are listed in the table.

Class H 4-10-2T Builders, works numbers and renumbering
Year	Builder	Works no.	NGR no.	Class H no.	Class H2 no.
1899	Dübs	3835	149	232	
1901	Dübs	4040	150	233	
1901	Dübs	4041	151	234	
1901	Dübs	4042	152	235	
1901	Dübs	4043	153	236	
1901	Dübs	4044	154	237	
1901	Dübs	4045	155	238	
1901	Dübs	4046	156	239	
1901	Dübs	4047	157	240	329
1901	Dübs	4048	158	241	
1901	Dübs	4049	159	242	
1901	Dübs	4050	160	243	
1901	Dübs	4051	161	244	
1901	Dübs	4052	162	245	
1901	Dübs	4053	163	246	
1901	Dübs	4054	164	247	
1901	Dübs	4055	165	248	
1901	Dübs	4056	166	249	
1901	Dübs	4057	167	250	
1901	Dübs	4058	168	251	
1901	Dübs	4059	169	252	
1901	Dübs	4060	170		227
1901	Dübs	4061	171	253	
1901	Dübs	4062	172	254	
1901	Dübs	4063	173		228
1901	Dübs	4064	174	255	
1902	Dübs	4117	175		229
1902	Dübs	4118	176	256	
1902	Dübs	4119	177	257	
1902	Dübs	4120	178	258	
1902	Dübs	4121	179	259	
1902	Dübs	4122	180	260	
1902	Dübs	4123	181	261	
1902	Dübs	4124	182	262	
1902	Dübs	4125	183	263	
1902	Dübs	4126	184	324	
1902	Dübs	4127	185	264	
1902	Dübs	4128	186	265	
1902	Dübs	4129	187	266	
1902	Dübs	4130	188	267	
1902	Dübs	4131	189	268	
1902	Dübs	4132	190	269	
1902	Dübs	4133	191	270	
1902	Dübs	4134	192	271	
1902	Dübs	4135	193	272	
1902	Dübs	4136	194	Scrapped	
1902	Dübs	4137	195	Scrapped	
1902	Dübs	4138	196	273	
1902	Dübs	4139	197	274	
1902	Dübs	4140	198	275	
1902	Dübs	4141	199	276	
1902	Dübs	4254	200	277	
1902	Dübs	4255	201	278	
1902	Dübs	4256	202	279	
1902	Dübs	4257	203	280	
1902	Dübs	4258	204	281	
1902	Dübs	4259	205	282	
1902	Dübs	4260	206	283	
1902	Dübs	4261	207	284	
1902	Dübs	4262	208	285	
1902	Dübs	4263	209	286	
1902	Dübs	4264	210	287	
1902	Dübs	4265	211	288	
1902	Dübs	4266	212	289	
1902	Dübs	4267	213	290	
1902	Dübs	4268	214	Scrapped	
1902	Dübs	4269	215	291	
1902	Dübs	4270	216	292	
1902	Dübs	4271	217		230
1902	Dübs	4272	218	293	
1902	Dübs	4273	219	294	330
1902	Dübs	4274	220	295	
1902	Dübs	4275	221	296	
1902	Dübs	4276	222	297	
1902	Dübs	4277	223	298	
1902	Dübs	4278	224	299	
1903	Dübs	4310	225	300	
1903	Dübs	4311	226	301	
1903	Dübs	4312	227	302	
1903	Dübs	4313	228	303	
1903	Dübs	4314	229	304	
1903	Dübs	4315	230	305	331
1903	Dübs	4316	231	306	
1903	Dübs	4317	232	307	
1903	Dübs	4318	233	308	
1903	Dübs	4319	234	309	
1903	Dübs	4320	235	310	
1903	Dübs	4321	236	311	
1903	Dübs	4322	237	312	
1903	Dübs	4323	238	313	
1903	Dübs	4324	239	314	
1903	Dübs	4323	240		231
1903	Dübs	4326	241	315	
1903	Dübs	4327	242	316	
1903	Dübs	4328	243	317	
1903	Dübs	4329	244	318	
1903	NBL	15723	245	319	
1903	NBL	15724	246	320	
1903	NBL	15725	247	321	
1903	NBL	15726	248	322	
1903	NBL	15727	249	323	

== Service ==
The Reid Tenwheelers were initially employed on the lower section of the Natal mainline and worked both passenger and goods trains. Most of them continued to work there even after more powerful locomotives were placed in service. When the Corridor Train was introduced between Durban and Johannesburg in 1903, the Reid Tenwheelers worked the trains between Durban and Volksrust, but their limited coal and water capacity necessitated en route engine changes at Inchanga, Pietermaritzburg, Mooirivier, Ladysmith and Hattingspruit.

In the SAR era, some were relocated to De Doorns in the Cape Province for banking service up the Hex River Railpass. They had a long service life and some, modified to the 4-8-2T Mountain type, remained in service until 1977.

== Other operators ==
=== Imperial Military Railways ===
In 1902 during the Second Boer War, the Imperial Military Railways (IMR) placed orders with Dübs and Company and Neilson, Reid and Company for altogether 35 locomotives of the Reid Tenwheeler type. In SAR service, these locomotives were designated Class H1 in 1912.

=== Industry ===
A final order for one new Reid Tenwheeler locomotive was placed by Witbank Collieries as late as 1927. The 137 locomotives built to this design was about double the number of all other 4-10-2 locomotives in use elsewhere in the world, all of which were tender locomotives which served mainly in the United States of America and Brazil.

== Illustration ==
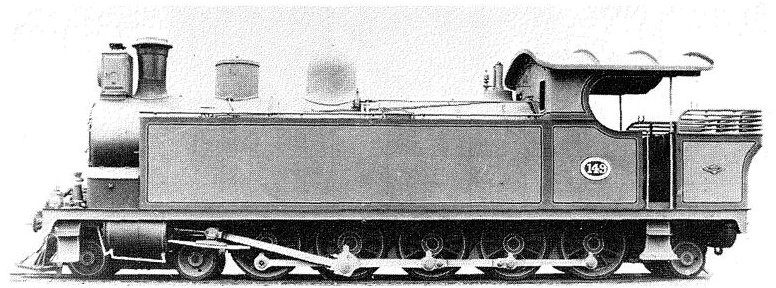
NGR Class C no. 149, SAR Class H no. 232, c. 1900
