= South African Class H1 4-8-2T =

1903 design of steam locomotive

CSAR Class E 4-8-2T South African Class H1 4-8-2T
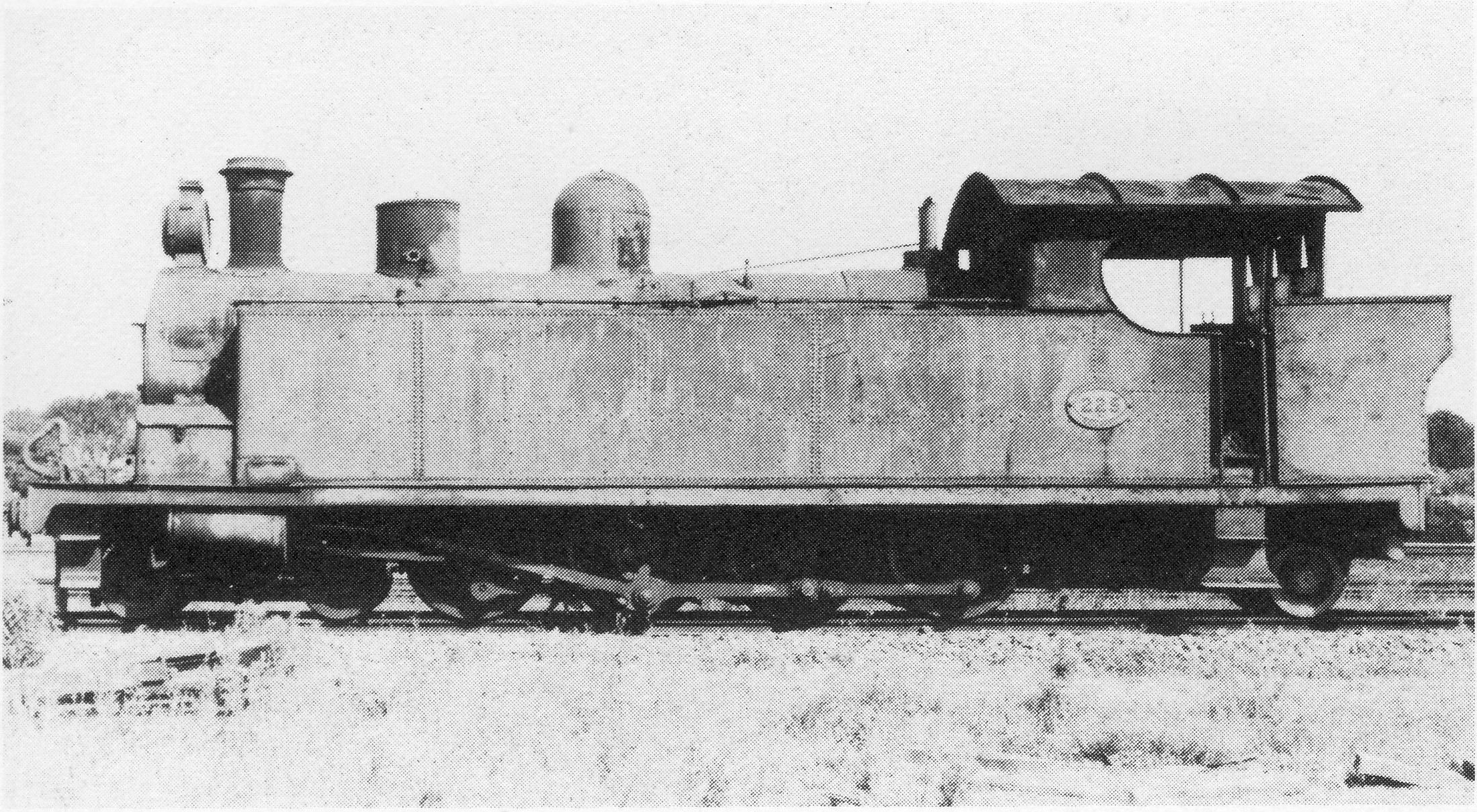
- CSAR Modified Class E no. 245, SAR Class H1 no. 225, c. 1912
Type and origin
- Power type: Steam
- Designer: Natal Government Railways (G.W. Reid)
- Builder: Dübs and Company; Neilson, Reid and Company; Central South African Railways
- Serial number: Dübs 4088, 4099, 4100; Neilson, Reid 6196, 6206, 6213
- Model: Converted Reid Tenwheeler
- Build date: c. 1903
- Total produced: 6
Specifications
- Configuration
  - Whyte: 4-8-2T (Mountain)
  - UIC: 2'D1'n2t
- Driver: 2nd coupled axle
- Gauge: 3 ft 6 in (1,067 mm) Cape gauge
- Leading dia.: 25 3/4 in (654 mm)
- Coupled dia.: 45 in (1,143 mm)
- Trailing dia.: 25 3/4 in (654 mm)
- Wheelbase
  - Engine: 30 ft 6 in (9,296 mm)
  - Leading: 5 ft 4 in (1,626 mm)
  - Coupled: 12 ft 6 in (3,810 mm)
- Length
  - Over couplers: 37 ft 6 in (11,430 mm)
- Height: 12 ft 6 in (3,810 mm)
- Axle load: 13 LT (13,210 kg)
  - Leading: 10 LT 4 cwt 2 qtr (10,390 kg)
  - Coupled: 13 LT (13,210 kg)
  - Trailing: 6 LT (6,096 kg)
- Adhesive weight: 52 LT (52,830 kg)
- Loco weight: 68 LT (69,090 kg)
- Fuel type: Coal
- Fuel capacity: 4 LT (4.1 t)
- Water cap.: 1,880 imp gal (8,550 L)
- Firebox
  - Type: Round-top
  - Grate area: 21 sq ft (2.0 m^{2})
- Boiler
  - Pitch: 6 ft 10 in (2,083 mm)
  - Diameter: 4 ft 7 7/8 in (1,419 mm)
  - Tube plates: 10 ft 4 in (3,150 mm)
  - Small tubes: 287: 1 3/4 in (44 mm)
- Boiler pressure: 175 psi (1,207 kPa)
- Safety valve: Ramsbottom
- Heating surface
  - Firebox: 135 sq ft (12.5 m^{2})
  - Tubes: 1,359 sq ft (126.3 m^{2})
  - Total surface: 1,494 sq ft (138.8 m^{2})
- Cylinders: Two
- Cylinder size: 19 in (483 mm) bore 27 in (686 mm) stroke
- Valve gear: Allan
- Couplers: Johnston link-and-pin AAR knuckle (1930s)
Performance figures
- Tractive effort: 28,430 lbf (126.5 kN) @ 75%
Career
- Operators: Imperial Military Railways; Central South African Railways; South African Railways
- Class: CSAR Class E, SAR Class H1
- Number in class: 6
- Numbers: CSAR 222, 233, 235, 245, 252; SAR 222–226
- Nicknames: Converted Reid
- Delivered: c. 1903
- First run: c. 1903
- Withdrawn: 1966
- The leading coupled axle had flangeless wheels

The South African Railways Class H1 4-8-2T of 1903 was a steam locomotive from the pre-Union era in Transvaal.

In 1902, towards the end of the Second Boer War, the Imperial Military Railways placed 35 4-10-2 tank locomotives in service, built to the specifications of the Reid Tenwheeler of the Natal Government Railways. At the end of the war, these locomotives came onto the roster of the Central South African Railways and were designated its Class E. Six of these locomotives were then converted to 4-8-2 tank locomotives. In 1912, after the establishment of the South African Railways, the five survivors of these six were designated Class H1.

== Origin ==
The requirement for a tank locomotive which could haul at least one-and-a-half times as much as a Dübs A 4-8-2T locomotive on the Natal Government Railways (NGR) mainline, resulted in the design of a 4-10-2 tank locomotive by G.W. Reid, the Locomotive Superintendent of the NGR at the end of the 19th century. On the NGR, the locomotive type became known as the Reid Tenwheeler, later designated the NGR Class C 4-10-2T.

== Manufacturers ==
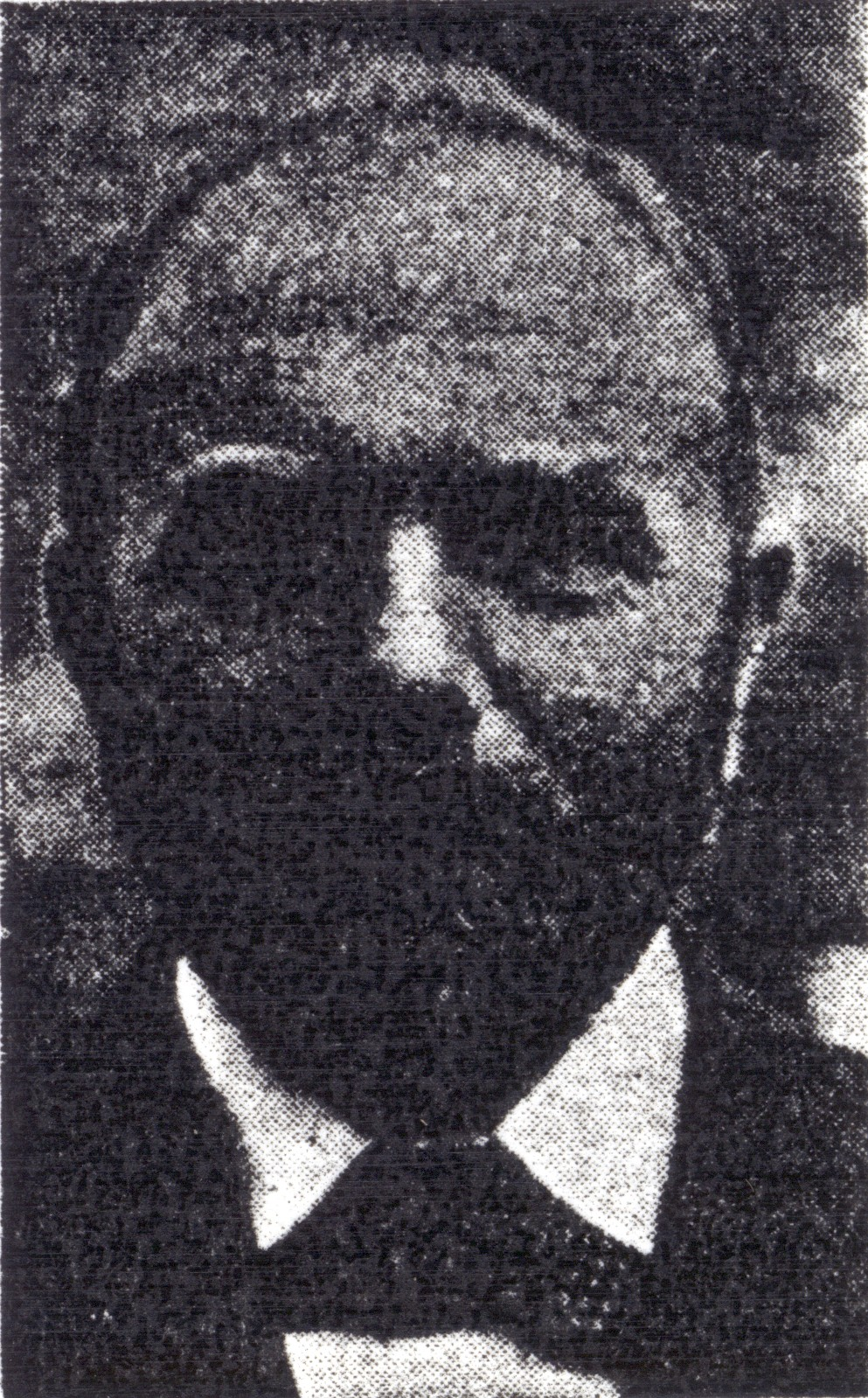
G.W. Reid

In 1902, during the Second Boer War, the Imperial Military Railways (IMR) of the invading British forces experienced a shortage of locomotives as a result of damage caused during hostilities and the transportation demands which were placed on the Railways by the British Military.

Lieutenant-Colonel E.P.C. Girouard KCMG DSO of the Royal Engineers, the Commissioner of Railways for the Transvaal and Orange River Colony, therefore placed urgent orders for 35 locomotives of the NGR's Reid Tenwheeler type. To ensure rapid delivery, the order was split between Dübs and Company, who built engine numbers 220 to 234, and Neilson, Reid and Company, who built numbers 235 to 254.

== Service ==
=== Imperial Military Railways ===
Compared to the NGR versions, the IMR locomotives were more ornate. In true military tradition, the steam domes, chimney caps and boiler bands were of polished brass. A weatherboard was affixed to the coal bunker to offer better protection to the crew when travelling bunker forward.

The practice of polished brasswork was followed on all new IMR locomotives and was continued even after the war, when the IMR became the Central South African Railways (CSAR).

=== Central South African Railways ===
At the end of the war, these Reid Tenwheeler locomotives were designated Class E on the CSAR roster.

Six of the Class E locomotives, CSAR numbers 222, 233–235, 245 and 252, were converted to 4-8-2T Mountain type locomotives c. 1903 by removing the fifth pair of coupled wheels and blanking off the resulting opening in the frame. The same modification was also done by the NGR on some of its own Reid Tenwheelers to make them more suitable for yard work.

=== South African Railways ===
When the Union of South Africa was established on 31 May 1910, the three Colonial government railways (Cape Government Railways, NGR and CSAR) were united under a single administration to control and administer the railways, ports and harbours of the Union. Although the South African Railways and Harbours came into existence in 1910, the actual classification and renumbering of all the rolling stock of the three constituent railways were only implemented with effect from 1 January 1912.

In SAR service, the five survivors of these CSAR 4-8-2 tank locomotives were designated Class H1. The locomotives were used extensively for shunting work in several parts of the country. The Class H1 had a long service life and the last of the Class was only withdrawn from service in 1966.

== Works numbers ==
The builders, works numbers, rebuilding and renumbering of all 35 original 4-10-2T locomotives are listed in the table.

IMR and CSAR Class E Reid Ten-wheelers
CSAR no.	Builder	Works no.	Rebuilt to	SAR no.
220	Dübs	4086	Class 13	1310
221	Dübs	4087	Class 13	1311
222	Dübs	4088	Class H1	222
223	Dübs	4089	Class 13	1312
224	Dübs	4090	Class 13	1313
225	Dübs	4091	Class 13	1314
226	Dübs	4092	Class 13	1315
227	Dübs	4093	Class 13	1316
228	Dübs	4094	Class 13	1317
229	Dübs	4095	Class 13	1318
230	Dübs	4096	Class 13	1319
231	Dübs	4097	Class 13	1320
232	Dübs	4098	Class 13	1321
233	Dübs	4099	Class H1	223
234	Dübs	4100	Class H1	Scrapped
235	Neilson Reid	6196	Class H1	224
236	Neilson Reid	6197	Class 13	1322
237	Neilson Reid	6198	Class 13	1323
238	Neilson Reid	6199	Class 13	1324
239	Neilson Reid	6200	Class 13	1325
240	Neilson Reid	6201	Class 13	1326
241	Neilson Reid	6202	Class 13	1327
242	Neilson Reid	6203	Class 13	1328
243	Neilson Reid	6204	Class 13	1329
244	Neilson Reid	6205	Class 13	1330
245	Neilson Reid	6206	Class H1	225
246	Neilson Reid	6207	Class 13	1331
247	Neilson Reid	6208	Class 13	1332
248	Neilson Reid	6209	Class 13	1333
249	Neilson Reid	6210	Class 13	1334
250	Neilson Reid	6211	Class 13	1335
251	Neilson Reid	6212	Class 13	1336
252	Neilson Reid	6213	Class H1	226
253	Neilson Reid	6214	Class 13	1337
254	Neilson Reid	6215	Class 13	1338
