= Cape Government Railways 7th Class locomotives =

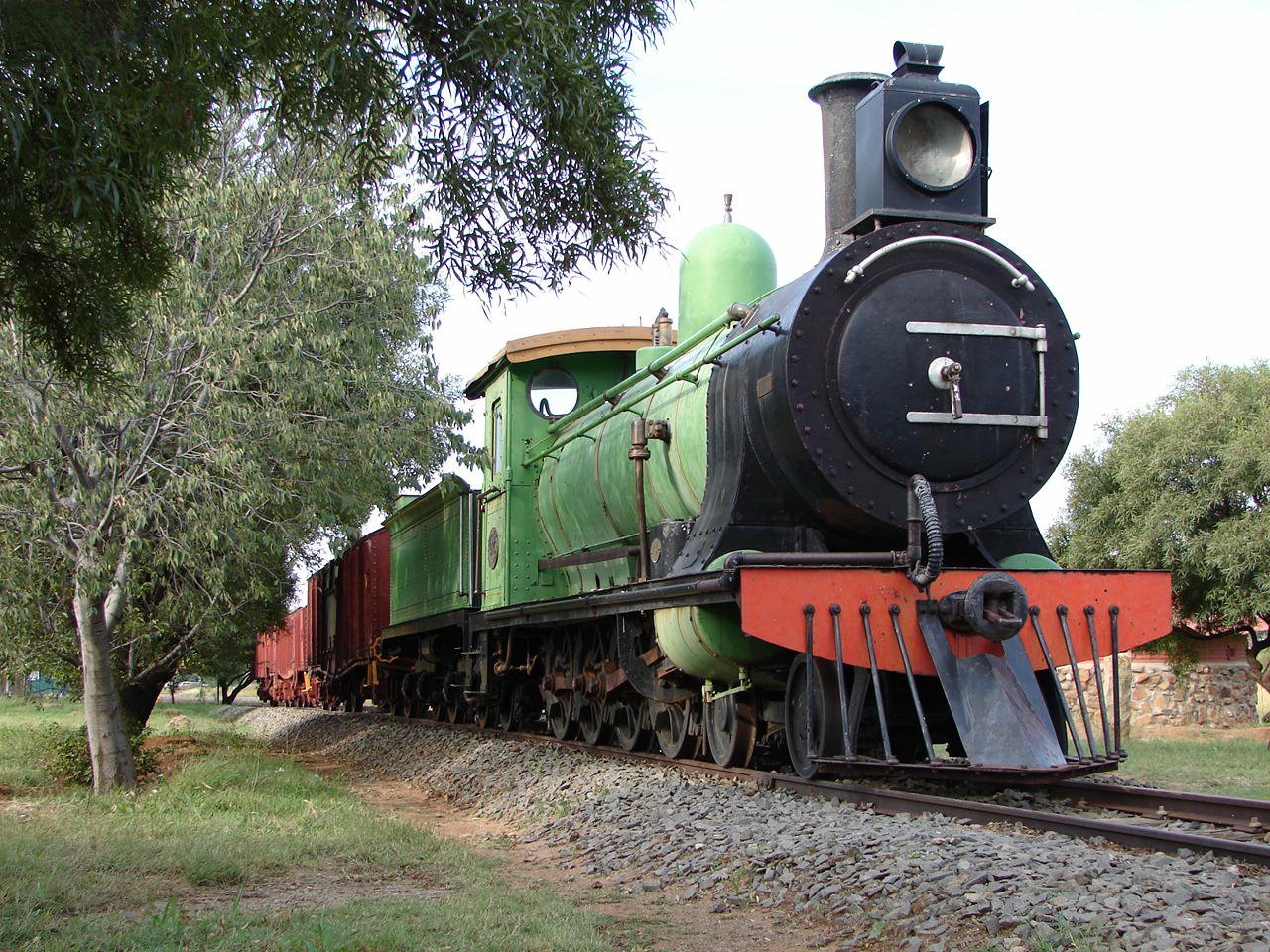
CGR 7th Class 4-8-0 of 1892

The Cape Government Railways 7th Class locomotives include three locomotive models, all designated 7th Class.

When the Union of South Africa was established on 31 May 1910, the three Colonial government railways (Cape Government Railways, Natal Government Railways and Central South African Railways) were united under a single administration to control and administer the railways, ports and harbours of the Union. The Cape Government Railways 7th Class locomotives were grouped into three different sub-classes on the new South African Railways.

- CGR 7th Class 4-8-0 1892 (SAR Class 7)
- CGR 7th Class 4-8-0 1896 (SAR Class 7A)
- CGR 7th Class 4-8-0 1902 (SAR Class 7C)
