= South African Class 7D 4-8-0 =

1899 design of steam locomotive

Rhodesia Railways 7th Class South African Class 7D 4-8-0
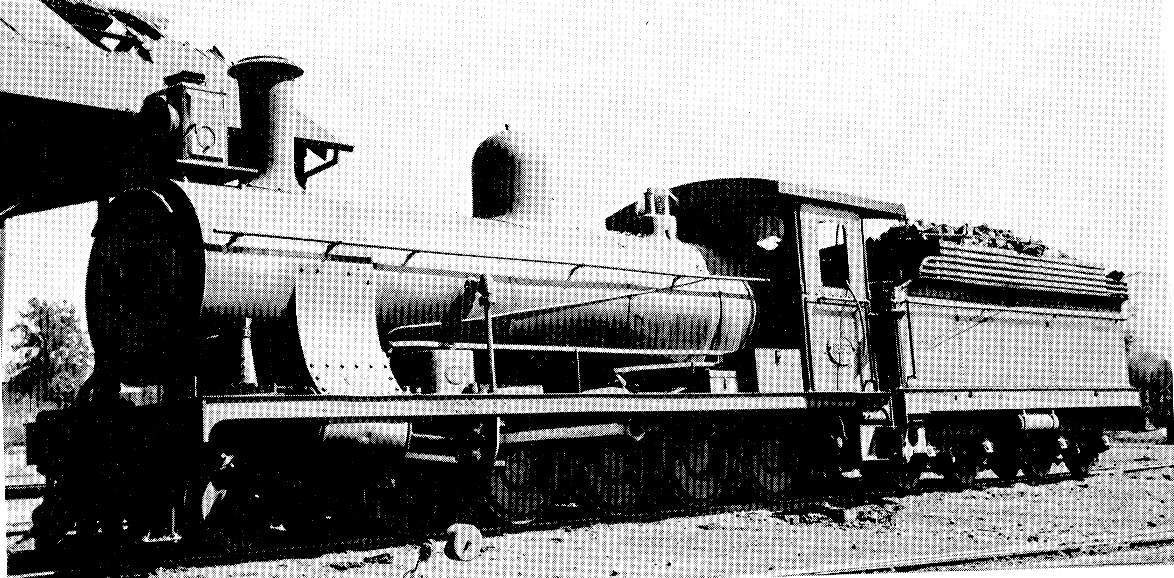
- RR 7th Class no. MR11, then no. MR18, then no. RRM67, then SAR Class 7D no. 1353
Type and origin
- ♠ Original locomotive, as built ♥ Locomotive equipped with superheating
- Power type: Steam
- Designer: Cape Government Railways (H.M. Beatty)
- Builder: Neilson, Reid and Company; Kitson and Company; North British Locomotive Company
- Order number: NR E834 & E835 (1899), E851 (1900); NBL L313 & L322 (1903)
- Serial number: NR 5675–5686, 5791–5802, 5817; Kitson 4062–4069; NBL 16085–16094, 16171–16180
- Model: CGR 7th Class
- Build date: 1899–1903
- Total produced: 52
Specifications
- Configuration
  - Whyte: 4-8-0 (Mastodon)
  - UIC: ♠ 2'Dn2 – ♥ 2'Dh2
- Driver: 2nd coupled axle
- Gauge: 3 ft 6 in (1,067 mm) Cape gauge
- Leading dia.: 28 1/2 in (724 mm)
- Coupled dia.: 42 3/4 in (1,086 mm)
- Tender wheels: 33 1/2 in (851 mm) as built 34 in (864 mm) retyred
- Wheelbase: 46 ft 2 in (14,072 mm)
  - Engine: 21 ft 3 1/2 in (6,490 mm)
  - Leading: 5 ft 3 in (1,600 mm)
  - Coupled: 12 ft (3,658 mm)
  - Tender: 16 ft 1 in (4,902 mm)
  - Tender bogie: 4 ft 7 in (1,397 mm)
- Length
  - Over couplers: 53 ft 5 1/4 in (16,288 mm)
- Height: 12 ft 10 in (3,912 mm)
- Frame type: Plate
- Axle load: ♠ 9 LT (9,144 kg) ♥ 9 LT 14 cwt (9,856 kg)
  - Leading: ♠ 10 LT 14 cwt (10,870 kg) ♥ 11 LT 2 cwt (11,280 kg)
  - 1st coupled: ♠ 9 LT (9,144 kg) ♥ 9 LT 8 cwt (9,551 kg)
  - 2nd coupled: ♠ 9 LT (9,144 kg) ♥ 9 LT 14 cwt (9,856 kg)
  - 3rd coupled: ♠ 8 LT 18 cwt (9,043 kg) ♥ 9 LT 10 cwt (9,652 kg)
  - 4th coupled: ♠ 8 LT 18 cwt (9,043 kg) ♥ 9 LT 8 cwt (9,551 kg)
  - Tender axle: 8 LT 10 cwt 2 qtr (8,662 kg) av.
- Adhesive weight: ♠ 35 LT 16 cwt (36,370 kg) ♥ 38 LT (38,610 kg)
- Loco weight: ♠ 46 LT 10 cwt (47,250 kg); 44 LT 7 cwt (45,060 kg) Kitson ♥ 49 LT 2 cwt (49,890 kg)
- Tender weight: 34 LT 2 cwt (34,650 kg)
- Total weight: ♠ 80 LT 12 cwt (81,890 kg); 78 LT 9 cwt (79,710 kg) Kitson ♥ 83 LT 4 cwt (84,540 kg)
- Tender type: ZC (2-axle bogies); ZA, ZB, ZC, ZE permitted
- Fuel type: Coal
- Fuel capacity: 5 LT 10 cwt (5.6 t)
- Water cap.: 2,600 imp gal (11,800 L)
- Firebox
  - Type: Round-top or Belpaire
  - Grate area: ♠ 17.5 sq ft (1.63 m^{2}) ♥ 18 sq ft (1.7 m^{2})
- Boiler
  - Pitch: ♠ 6 ft 8 in (2,032 mm) ♥ 6 ft 10 in (2,083 mm)
  - Diameter: ♠ 4 ft 4 in (1,321 mm) ♥ 4 ft 6 in (1,372 mm)
  - Tube plates: ♠ 10 ft 9 in (3,277 mm) ♥ 10 ft 9 in (3,277 mm)
  - Small tubes: ♠ 185: 1 7/8 in (48 mm) ♥ 100: 1 7/8 in (48 mm)
  - Large tubes: ♥ 18: 5 1/2 in (140 mm)
- Boiler pressure: ♠ 160 psi (1,103 kPa); 170 psi (1,172 kPa) adjusted ♥ 180 psi (1,240 kPa)
- Safety valve: Ramsbottom
- Heating surface
  - Firebox: ♠ 102 sq ft (9.5 m^{2}); 112 sq ft (10.4 m^{2}) Kitson ♥ 113 sq ft (10.5 m^{2})
  - Tubes: ♠ 976 sq ft (90.7 m^{2}) ♥ 806 sq ft (74.9 m^{2})
  - Total surface: ♠ 1,078 sq ft (100.1 m^{2}); 1,088 sq ft (101.1 m^{2}) Kitson ♥ 919 sq ft (85.4 m^{2})
- Superheater
  - Heating area: ♥ 206 sq ft (19.1 m^{2})
- Cylinders: Two
- Cylinder size: 17 in (432 mm) bore 23 in (584 mm) stroke
- Valve gear: Stephenson
- Valve type: ♠ Slide – ♥ Piston
- Couplers: Johnston link-and-pin AAR knuckle (1930s)
Performance figures
- Tractive effort: ♠ 18,660 lbf (83.0 kN) @ 75% 19,810 lbf (88.1 kN) @ 75% adjusted ♥ 22,240 lbf (98.9 kN) @ 75%
- Factor of adh.: NR & NBL-built: 4.32; Kitson-built: 4.531
Career
- Operators: Imperial Military Railways; Mashonaland Railways; Rhodesia Railways Northern Ext; Rhodesia Railways; South African Railways
- Class: IMR, MR, RRM & RR 7th Class; SAR Class 7D
- Number in class: RR 52, SAR 5
- Numbers: BR 7–8, RR 1–50, IMR 110; SAR 1351–1355
- Delivered: 1899–1903 to RR, 1915 to SAR
- First run: 1899
- Withdrawn: 1972
- The leading coupled axle had flangeless wheels

The South African Railways Class 7D 4-8-0 of 1915 was a steam locomotive.

Between 1899 and 1903, the Rhodesia Railways placed 52 Cape 7th Class 4-8-0 Mastodon steam locomotives in service. During the Second Boer War, one more was obtained from the Imperial Military Railways in March 1901, as replacement for a locomotive which was damaged beyond local repair capabilities as a result of hostilities during delivery.

In May 1915, five of these locomotives were sold to the South African Railways, where they were renumbered and reclassified, four of them to Class 7D and the remaining one erroneously to Class 7B. At the same time, the ex Imperial Military Railways locomotive was also sold back to South Africa and was, also erroneously, designated Class 7D.

== Rhodesian 7th Class ==
The original Cape 7th Class locomotive had been designed in 1892 by H.M. Beatty, at the time the Cape Government Railways Western System Locomotive Superintendent.

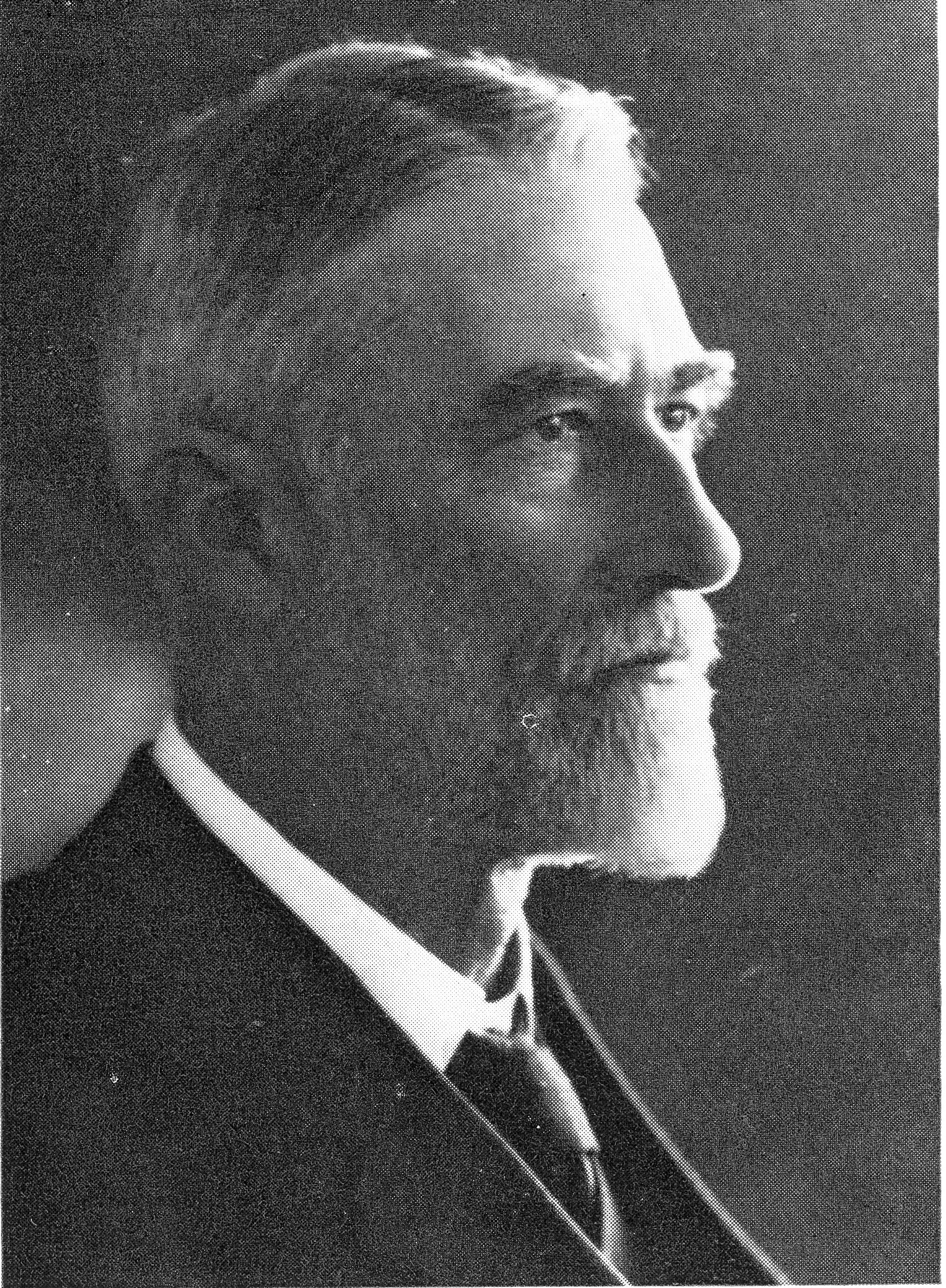
H.M. Beatty

Between 1899 and 1903, 52 such Cape 7th Class 4-8-0 steam locomotives were built for the Beira and Mashonaland and Rhodesia Railways (BMR), later the Rhodesia Railways (RR). These locomotives were acquired by Southern Rhodesia at the time when railways were still expanding from South Africa via the Bechuanaland Protectorate into Southern Rhodesia in the southwest, and from Beira in Mozambique to Umtali in the east, and while the Second Boer War was in progress. At the time, the system was composed of several smaller railways, still largely under construction, which were eventually all linked up in 1902. These were:

- The fledgling Bechuanaland Railways (BR), which was still being operated by the Cape Government Railways (CGR), from Vryburg via Mafeking in the Cape Colony to Bulawayo in Southern Rhodesia.
- The Mashonaland Railways (MR), which operated in Southern Rhodesia from Bulawayo to Umtali in the east.
- The Rhodesia Railways Northern Extensions (RRM), which operated north and east of Bulawayo, towards Northern Rhodesia.
- The Beira and Mashonaland and Rhodesia Railways (BMR), which operated between Umtali in Southern Rhodesia and Beira in Mozambique.

== Manufacturers ==
The 52 locomotives were ordered in five batches from three British manufacturers.

- Twelve were delivered by Neilson, Reid and Company between August and October 1899. They were virtually identical to the SAR Class 7A. Two of them were numbered BR7 and BR8 for the BMR, for service at the Beira end, while the rest were numbered in the range from RR1 to RR10.

In 1901, eleven of them were renumbered in the range from MR8 to MR18, MR20 and MR21, not in order, for the BMR. The exception was no. RR8, which was delivered damaged beyond local repair abilities, apparently as a result of hostilities, while in transit through the area under control of the British Military near Mafeking. A Neilson, Reid-built 7th Class locomotive of the Imperial Military Railways (IMR), no. IMR 110, was subsequently transferred to the BMR at Umtali in March 1901 as replacement for the damaged no. RR8. It was renumbered to MR19, the number which would have been allocated to no. RR8. The renumberings are tabled below.

- A second batch of twelve were delivered by Neilson, Reid in August 1900 and numbered in the range from RR11 to RR22. They were placed in service on the line from Vryburg to Bulawayo and shedded at Mafeking. In 1901, four of them, no. RR11, RR12, RR17 and RR20, were relocated to the BMR and renumbered in the range from MR20 to MR23, in order. Many of the Neilson, Reid-built locomotives from both batches were renumbered a second time in 1906, as shown in the table.
- A third batch of eight locomotives was delivered from Kitson and Company between 1901 and 1903, numbered in the range from RR23 to RR30. These were built with Belpaire fireboxes instead of the usual round-topped fireboxes with which all earlier 7th Class locomotives of the CGR, the IMR and the RR were delivered. They were also placed in service at Mafeking.
- The fourth batch of ten locomotives, again with Belpaire fireboxes, was delivered from North British Locomotive Company (NBL) in October and November 1903. They were numbered in the range from RR31 to RR40. Of these, numbers RR31 to RR38 were allocated to the Mashonaland Railways-Kalomo-Broken Hill (MR-KB) section. They retained their RR numbers, but had brass plates with the letters "KB" affixed above their number plates on their cab sides, to indicate their ownership. The other two were also placed in service at Mafeking.
- The fifth and final batch of ten Rhodesian 7th Class locomotives was also built by NBL and delivered in November and December 1903, numbered in the range from RR41 to RR50. They were also placed in service at Mafeking.

== South African Railways ==
In May 1915, six of the Neilson, Reid-built 7th Class locomotives were purchased by the South African Railways (SAR) to augment its locomotive stock, which was being taxed severely due to war conditions at the time. These six locomotives included the war-damaged no. RR8 which had still not been repaired and consequently never ran a mile in revenue service in Rhodesia, as well as the ex IMR locomotive which had been transferred to Rhodesia as compensation for the damaged no. RR8.

These locomotives were initially referred to as Class RR, until they were later designated SAR Class 7D. Five of them were renumbered in the range from 1351 to 1355 on the SAR roster. The sixth, SAR no. 949, was erroneously designated Class 7B.

=== Classification errors ===
During this SAR classification and renumbering process, two of these locomotives were incorrectly classified, possibly as a result of their records getting exchanged in an apparent administrative error.

- Ex IMR no. 110, which had replaced the damaged no. RR8, would have become Central South African Railways (CSAR) no. 380 in 1902 and, with the rest of the ex IMR locomotives, would have been designated SAR Class 7B in 1912, but this never happened since the engine had already been transferred to the BMR at Umtali in March 1901. When it was taken onto the SAR roster from Rhodesia in 1915, it was incorrectly designated as Class 7D instead of Class 7B and renumbered SAR no. 1355.
- Ex no. RR1, later no. MR8 and then no. RRM63, was incorrectly designated as Class 7B instead of ex IMR no. 110 and was renumbered SAR no. 949.

=== Class 7 sub-classes ===
Other 7th Class locomotives which came onto the SAR roster from the other Colonial railways in the region in 1912, namely the CGR, CSAR, the Natal Government Railways (NGR) and, in 1925, from the New Cape Central Railways (NCCR), were grouped into six different sub-classes by the SAR, becoming SAR Classes 7, 7A to 7C, 7E and 7F.

== Modifications ==
During the 1930s, many of the Class 7 family of locomotives were equipped with superheating and piston valves. On the Class 7B and Class 7C, this conversion was sometimes indicated with an "S" suffix to the class letter on the locomotive number plates, but on the rest of the Class 7 family this distinction was not applied consistently. The superheated versions could be identified by the position of the chimney on the smokebox, the chimney having been displaced forward to provide space behind it in the smokebox for the superheater header.

== Service ==
=== South Africa ===
In SAR service, the Class 7 series worked on every system in the country. They remained in branch line service until they were finally withdrawn in 1972.

=== South West Africa ===
In 1915, shortly after the outbreak of the First World War, the German South West Africa colony was occupied by the Union Defence Forces. Since a large part of the territory's railway infrastructure and rolling stock was destroyed or damaged by retreating German forces, an urgent need arose for locomotives for use on the Cape gauge lines in that territory. In 1917, numbers 1351 to 1353 were transferred to the Defence Department for service in South West Africa.

These three locomotives remained in South West Africa after the war. The Class 7s proved to be so successful in that territory that more were gradually transferred there in later years. By the time the Class 24 locomotives arrived in SWA in 1949, 53 locomotives of the Class 7 family were still in use there. Most remained there and were only transferred back to South Africa when the Class 32-000 diesel-electric locomotives replaced them in 1961.

== Works numbers ==
Their builders, works numbers and renumbering are listed in the table.

Rhodesia Railways 7th Class, SAR Class 7D Builders, works numbers and renumbering
Builder	Works No.	Year	RR No.	1901 No.	1906 No.	SAR No.
Neilson, Reid	5675	1899	BR 7	MR 14	MR 8	
Neilson, Reid	5676	1899	BR 8	MR 15	MR 9	
Neilson, Reid	5677	1899	RR 1	MR 8	RRM 63	Class 7B 949
Neilson, Reid	5678	1899	RR 2	MR 9	To Shire	
Neilson, Reid	5679	1899	RR 3	MR 10	MR 10	
Neilson, Reid	5680	1899	RR 4	MR 11	MR 11	
Neilson, Reid	5681	1899	RR 5	MR 12	MR 12	
Neilson, Reid	5682	1899	RR 6	MR 13	RRM 64	1352
Neilson, Reid	5683	1899	MR 11	MR 18	RRM 67	1353
Neilson, Reid	5684	1899	RR 8			1354
Neilson, Reid	5685	1899	RR 9	MR 16	RRM 65	1351
Neilson, Reid	5686	1899	RR 10	MR 17	RRM 66	
Neilson, Reid	5791	1900	RR 11	MR 20	RRM 69	
Neilson, Reid	5792	1900	RR 12	MR 21	RRM 70	
Neilson, Reid	5793	1900	RR 13			
Neilson, Reid	5794	1900	RR 14			
Neilson, Reid	5795	1900	RR 15			
Neilson, Reid	5796	1900	RR 16			
Neilson, Reid	5797	1900	RR 17	MR 22	RRM 71	
Neilson, Reid	5798	1900	RR 18			
Neilson, Reid	5799	1900	RR 19			
Neilson, Reid	5800	1900	RR 20	MR 23	RRM 72	
Neilson, Reid	5801	1900	RR 21			
Neilson, Reid	5802	1900	RR 22			
Neilson, Reid	5817	1900	IMR 110	MR 19	RRM 68	1355
Kitson	4062	1901	RR 23			
Kitson	4063	1901	RR 24			
Kitson	4064	1901	RR 25			
Kitson	4065	1901	RR 26			
Kitson	4066	1901	RR 27			
Kitson	4067	1901	RR 28			
Kitson	4068	1901	RR 29			
Kitson	4069	1901	RR 30			
NBL	16085	1903	RR 31			
NBL	16086	1903	RR 32			
NBL	16087	1903	RR 33			
NBL	16088	1903	RR 34			
NBL	16089	1903	RR 35			
NBL	16090	1903	RR 36			
NBL	16091	1903	RR 37			
NBL	16092	1903	RR 38			
NBL	16093	1903	RR 39			
NBL	16094	1903	RR 40			
NBL	16171	1903	RR 41			
NBL	16172	1903	RR 42			
NBL	16173	1903	RR 43			
NBL	16174	1903	RR 44			
NBL	16175	1903	RR 45			
NBL	16176	1903	RR 46			
NBL	16177	1903	RR 47			
NBL	16178	1903	RR 48			
NBL	16179	1903	RR 49			
NBL	16180	1903	RR 50			
