= South African Class 7E 4-8-0 =

1899 design of steam locomotive

NCCR 7th Class 4-8-0 1899 South African Class 7E 4-8-0
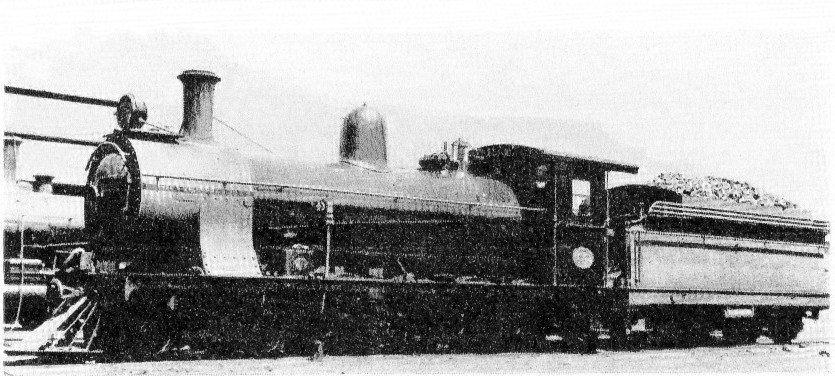
- New Cape Central Railway no. 4 South African Railways no. 1347
Type and origin
- ♠ – Original locomotive, as built ♣ – Original locomotive with adjusted boiler pressure ♥ – Locomotive equipped with superheating
- Power type: Steam
- Designer: Cape Government Railways (H.M. Beatty)
- Builder: Neilson, Reid and Company; North British Locomotive Company
- Serial number: Neilson, Reid 5653, 5702–5704; NBL 15903, 15904 & 16348
- Model: CGR 7th Class
- Build date: 1899–1904
- Total produced: 7
Specifications
- Configuration
  - Whyte: 4-8-0 (Mastodon)
  - UIC: ♠ 2'Dn2 – ♥ 2'Dh2
- Driver: 2nd coupled axle
- Gauge: 3 ft 6 in (1,067 mm) Cape gauge
- Leading dia.: 28 1/2 in (724 mm)
- Coupled dia.: 42 3/4 in (1,086 mm)
- Tender wheels: 33 1/2 in (851 mm) as built 34 in (864 mm) retyred
- Wheelbase: 46 ft 2 in (14,072 mm)
  - Engine: 21 ft 3 1/2 in (6,490 mm)
  - Leading: 5 ft 3 in (1,600 mm)
  - Coupled: 12 ft (3,658 mm)
  - Tender: 16 ft 1 in (4,902 mm)
  - Tender bogie: 4 ft 7 in (1,397 mm)
- Length
  - Over couplers: 53 ft 5 in (16,281 mm)
- Height: 12 ft 10 in (3,912 mm)
- Frame type: Plate
- Axle load: ♠ 9 LT (9,144 kg) ♥ 9 LT 14 cwt (9,856 kg)
  - Leading: ♠ 10 LT 14 cwt (10,870 kg) ♥ 11 LT 2 cwt (11,280 kg)
  - 1st coupled: ♠ 9 LT (9,144 kg) ♥ 9 LT 8 cwt (9,551 kg)
  - 2nd coupled: ♠ 9 LT (9,144 kg) ♥ 9 LT 14 cwt (9,856 kg)
  - 3rd coupled: ♠ 8 LT 18 cwt (9,043 kg) ♥ 9 LT 10 cwt (9,652 kg)
  - 4th coupled: ♠ 8 LT 18 cwt (9,043 kg) ♥ 9 LT 8 cwt (9,551 kg)
  - Tender bogie: Bogie 1: 17 LT 8 cwt (17,680 kg); Bogie 2: 18 LT 2 cwt (18,390 kg)
  - Tender axle: 9 LT 1 cwt (9,195 kg)
- Adhesive weight: ♠ 35 LT 16 cwt (36,370 kg) ♥ 38 LT (38,610 kg)
- Loco weight: ♠ 46 LT 10 cwt (47,250 kg) ♥ 49 LT 2 cwt (49,890 kg)
- Tender weight: 35 LT 10 cwt (36,070 kg)
- Total weight: ♠ 82 LT (83,320 kg) ♥ 84 LT 12 cwt (85,960 kg)
- Tender type: ZC (2-axle bogies); ZA, ZB, ZC, ZE permitted
- Fuel type: Coal
- Fuel capacity: 6 LT 10 cwt (6.6 t)
- Water cap.: 2,600 imp gal (11,800 L)
- Firebox
  - Type: Round-top
  - Grate area: ♠ 17.5 sq ft (1.63 m^{2}) ♥ 18 sq ft (1.7 m^{2})
- Boiler
  - Pitch: ♠ 6 ft 8 in (2,032 mm) ♥ 6 ft 10 in (2,083 mm)
  - Diameter: ♠ 4 ft 4 in (1,321 mm) ♥ 4 ft 6 in (1,372 mm)
  - Tube plates: 10 ft 9 in (3,277 mm)
  - Small tubes: ♠ 185: 1 7/8 in (48 mm) ♥ 100: 1 7/8 in (48 mm)
  - Large tubes: ♥ 18: 5 1/2 in (140 mm)
- Boiler pressure: ♠ 160 psi (1,103 kPa) ♣ 170 psi (1,172 kPa) ♥ 180 psi (1,241 kPa)
- Safety valve: Ramsbottom
- Heating surface
  - Firebox: ♠ 102 sq ft (9.5 m^{2}) ♥ 113 sq ft (10.498 m^{2})
  - Tubes: ♠ 976 sq ft (90.7 m^{2}) ♥ 806 sq ft (74.9 m^{2})
  - Total surface: ♠ 1,078 sq ft (100.1 m^{2}) ♥ 919 sq ft (85.4 m^{2})
- Superheater
  - Heating area: ♥ 206 sq ft (19.1 m^{2})
- Cylinders: Two
- Cylinder size: 17 in (432 mm) bore 23 in (584 mm) stroke
- Valve gear: Stephenson
- Couplers: Johnston link-and-pin AAR knuckle (1930s)
Performance figures
- Tractive effort: ♠ 18,660 lbf (83.0 kN) @ 75% ♣ 19,810 lbf (88.1 kN) @ 75% ♥ 22,240 lbf (98.9 kN) @ 75%
- Factor of adh.: 4.3
Career
- Operators: New Cape Central Railway; South African Railways
- Class: NCCR 7th Class, SAR Class 7E
- Number in class: 7
- Numbers: NCCR 1–7, SAR 1344–1350
- Delivered: 1899–1904
- First run: 1899
- Withdrawn: 1965–1972
- The leading coupled axle had flangeless wheels

The South African Railways Class 7E 4-8-0 of 1899 was a steam locomotive from the pre-Union era in the Cape of Good Hope.

In 1899, the New Cape Central Railway placed one Cape 7th Class 4-8-0 Mastodon type steam locomotive in service. Another three were commissioned in 1900, two more in 1903 and another one in 1904. In 1925, when the New Cape Central Railway was amalgamated into the South African Railways, these seven locomotives were renumbered and designated Class 7E.

== New Cape Central Railway ==
The New Cape Central Railway (NCCR) was formed in January 1893, when it purchased all the assets of the bankrupted Cape Central Railway (CCR), who had constructed a railway line from Worcester via Robertson to Roodewal. In 1894, the NCCR began work to extend the line to Swellendam. From there, it continued via Heidelberg to Riversdale, which was reached on 3 December 1903.

The tracks were originally laid with 46 1/2 pounds per yard (23.1 kilograms per metre) rail. When Voorbaai near Mosselbaai was reached in 1904, 211 miles (340 kilometres) from Worcester, it made the NCCR the longest private railway in South Africa.

== Manufacturers ==
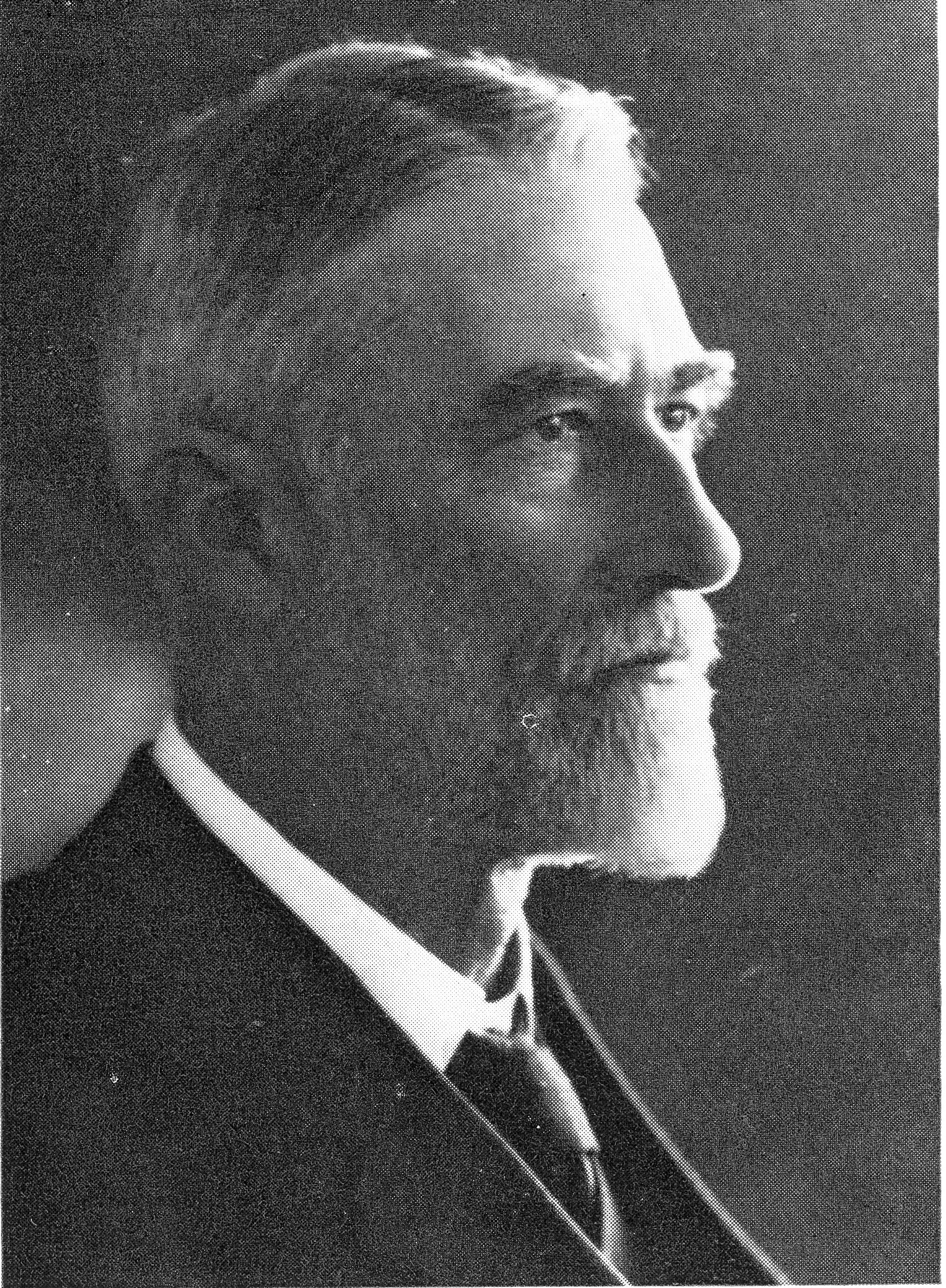
H.M. Beatty

The original Cape 7th Class locomotive had been designed in 1892 by H.M. Beatty, at the time the Cape Government Railways Western System Locomotive Superintendent. The NCCR acquired its first seven Cape 7th Class locomotives piecemeal over a period of five years. The first locomotive, NCCR no. 1, was ordered from Neilson, Reid and Company in 1899, followed by three more from the same manufacturer in 1900, numbered in the range from 2 to 4.

Two more were ordered from Neilson, Reid in 1903, numbered 5 and 6, but since three Scottish locomotive builders (Dübs and Company, Neilson, Reid and Sharp, Stewart and Company) merged into the North British Locomotive Company (NBL) while the locomotives were being built, they were delivered as having been built by the newly established NBL at the Hyde Park works of the former Neilson, Reid.

The seventh 7th Class locomotive, no. 7, was acquired in 1904, also built by NBL. On the NBL works list, this locomotive is shown as actually having been built for Pauling and Company, the contractors who constructed the railway.

== Class 7 sub-classes ==
In 1925, the NCCR was amalgamated into the South African Railways (SAR) and these seven 7th Class locomotives were taken onto the SAR roster, designated Class 7E and renumbered in the range from 1344 to 1350.

Other 7th Class locomotives which had come onto the SAR roster from the Colonial railways in the Southern African region in 1912, namely the Cape Government Railways (CGR), Central South African Railways (CSAR), Natal Government Railways (NGR) and Rhodesia Railways (RR), as well as more 7th Class locomotives which were acquired by the NCCR in 1913, were grouped into six different sub-classes by the SAR, becoming SAR Classes 7, 7A to 7D and 7F.

== Modifications ==
During the 1930s, many of the Class 7 family of locomotives were equipped with superheating and piston valves. On the Class 7B and Class 7C, this conversion was sometimes indicated with an "S" suffix to the class letter on the locomotive number plates, but on the rest of the Class 7 family this distinction was not applied consistently. The superheated versions could be identified by the position of the chimney on the smokebox, the chimney having been displaced forward to provide space behind it in the smokebox for the superheater header.

== Service ==
In SAR service, the Class 7 family served on every system in the country. They remained in branch line service, particularly at Tarkastad and Ladysmith and also on the Touws River-Ladismith branchline, where three Classes 7 and 7A and one Class 7E were on strength in January 1956.

By April 1962, two Class 7Es, numbers 1347 and 1348, were still shedded at Touws River to work the Ladismith branch. The Class 7Es were long-lived and these last two engines of the class were withdrawn from service in 1965.

== Works numbers ==
The Class 7E builders, years built, works numbers and renumbering are listed in the table.

Class 7E 4-8-0 Works numbers and renumbering
| Builder | Year | Works no. | NCCR no. | SAR no. |
|---|---|---|---|---|
| Neilson Reid | 1899 | 5653 | 1 | 1344 |
| Neilson Reid | 1900 | 5702 | 2 | 1345 |
| Neilson Reid | 1900 | 5703 | 3 | 1346 |
| Neilson Reid | 1900 | 5704 | 4 | 1347 |
| NBL | 1903 | 15903 | 5 | 1348 |
| NBL | 1903 | 15904 | 6 | 1349 |
| NBL | 1904 | 16348 | 7 | 1350 |
