= South African Class 7F 4-8-0 =

1913 design of steam locomotive

NCCR 7th Class 4-8-0 1913 South African Class 7F 4-8-0
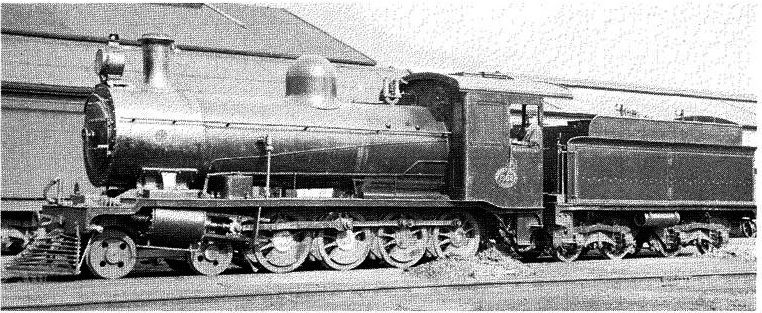
- NCCR 7th Class no. 10; SAR Class 7F no. 1358
Type and origin
- Power type: Steam
- Designer: Cape Government Railways (H.M. Beatty)
- Builder: North British Locomotive Company
- Serial number: 20217-20219
- Model: CGR 7th Class
- Build date: 1913
- Total produced: 3
Specifications
- Configuration
  - Whyte: 4-8-0 (Mastodon)
  - UIC: 2'Dn2
- Driver: 2nd coupled axle
- Gauge: 3 ft 6 in (1,067 mm) Cape gauge
- Leading dia.: 28 1/2 in (724 mm)
- Coupled dia.: 42 3/4 in (1,086 mm)
- Tender wheels: 33 1/2 in (851 mm) as built 34 in (864 mm) retyred
- Wheelbase: 46 ft 6 in (14,173 mm)
  - Engine: 21 ft 3 1/2 in (6,490 mm)
  - Leading: 5 ft 3 in (1,600 mm)
  - Coupled: 12 ft (3,658 mm)
  - Tender: 16 ft 1 in (4,902 mm)
  - Tender bogie: 4 ft 7 in (1,397 mm)
- Length
  - Over couplers: 53 ft 9 1/8 in (16,386 mm)
- Height: 12 ft 10 in (3,912 mm)
- Frame type: Plate
- Axle load: 9 LT 16 cwt (9,957 kg)
  - Leading: 10 LT 14 cwt (10,870 kg)
  - 1st coupled: 9 LT 16 cwt (9,957 kg)
  - 2nd coupled: 9 LT 15 cwt (9,906 kg)
  - 3rd coupled: 9 LT 16 cwt (9,957 kg)
  - 4th coupled: 9 LT 13 cwt (9,805 kg)
  - Tender bogie: Bogie 1: 17 LT 8 cwt (17,680 kg); Bogie 2: 18 LT 2 cwt (18,390 kg)
  - Tender axle: 9 LT 1 cwt (9,195 kg)
- Adhesive weight: 39 LT (39,630 kg)
- Loco weight: 49 LT 14 cwt (50,500 kg)
- Tender weight: 35 LT 10 cwt (36,070 kg)
- Total weight: 85 LT 4 cwt (86,570 kg)
- Tender type: ZC (2-axle bogies); ZA, ZB, ZC, ZE permitted
- Fuel type: Coal
- Fuel capacity: 6 LT 10 cwt (6.6 t)
- Water cap.: 2,600 imp gal (11,800 L)
- Firebox
  - Type: Round-top
  - Grate area: 17.5 sq ft (1.63 m^{2})
- Boiler
  - Pitch: 7 ft 3 in (2,210 mm)
  - Diameter: 4 ft 6 in (1,372 mm)
  - Tube plates: 10 ft 9 in (3,277 mm)
  - Small tubes: 185: 1 7/8 in (48 mm)
- Boiler pressure: 180 psi (1,241 kPa)
- Safety valve: Ramsbottom
- Heating surface
  - Firebox: 119 sq ft (11.1 m^{2})
  - Tubes: 976 sq ft (90.7 m^{2})
  - Total surface: 1,095 sq ft (101.7 m^{2})
- Cylinders: Two
- Cylinder size: 17 1/2 in (444 mm) bore 23 in (584 mm) stroke
- Valve gear: Stephenson
- Couplers: Johnston link-and-pin AAR knuckle (1930s)
Performance figures
- Tractive effort: 22,240 lbf (98.9 kN) @ 75%
- Factor of adh.: 3.928
Career
- Operators: New Cape Central Railway; South African Railways
- Class: NCCR 7th Class, SAR Class 7F
- Number in class: 3
- Numbers: NCCR 9-11, SAR 1357-1359
- Delivered: 1913
- First run: 1913
- Withdrawn: 1950–1958
- The leading coupled axle had flangeless wheels

The South African Railways Class 7F 4-8-0 of 1913 was a steam locomotive.

In 1913, the New Cape Central Railway placed three Cape 7th Class 4-8-0 Mastodon type steam locomotives in service. In 1925, when the New Cape Central Railway was amalgamated into the South African Railways, these three locomotives were renumbered and designated Class 7F.

== New Cape Central Railway ==
The New Cape Central Railway (NCCR) was formed in January 1893 when it purchased all the assets of the bankrupted Cape Central Railway (CCR), which had constructed a railway from Worcester via Robertson to Roodewal, now Ashton. In 1894, the NCCR began work to extend the line to Swellendam. From there it continued via Heidelberg to Riversdale, which was reached on 3 December 1903. Voorbaai, near Mosselbaai, was reached in 1904.

Unlike most other privately owned railways in South Africa, the NCCR prospered and was well and efficiently run. Prior to 1917 dividends were small, but from 1917 to 1925, dividends of 4½% were declared each year. The NCCR was the last component railway to be added to the South African Railways (SAR) when it was liquidated and amalgamated in May 1925. All the NCCR locomotives which came onto the SAR roster continued to give good service for many years.

== Manufacturer ==
These last three NCCR 7th Class locomotives were ordered from and built by the North British Locomotive Company (NBL) in 1913, numbered in the range from NCCR 9 to 11.

== Characteristics ==
The original Cape 7th Class had been designed in 1892 by H.M. Beatty, Cape Government Railways (Western System) Locomotive Superintendent. While there was little difference from the original 7th Class design as far as the main dimensions were concerned, these three locomotives were more modern in appearance. They were more powerful, with a higher boiler pressure of 180 pounds per square inch (1,241 kilopascals) and 17 1/2 inches (444 millimetres) bore cylinders instead of the 17 inches (432 millimetres) bore of all but one (the Class 7C) of the earlier models.

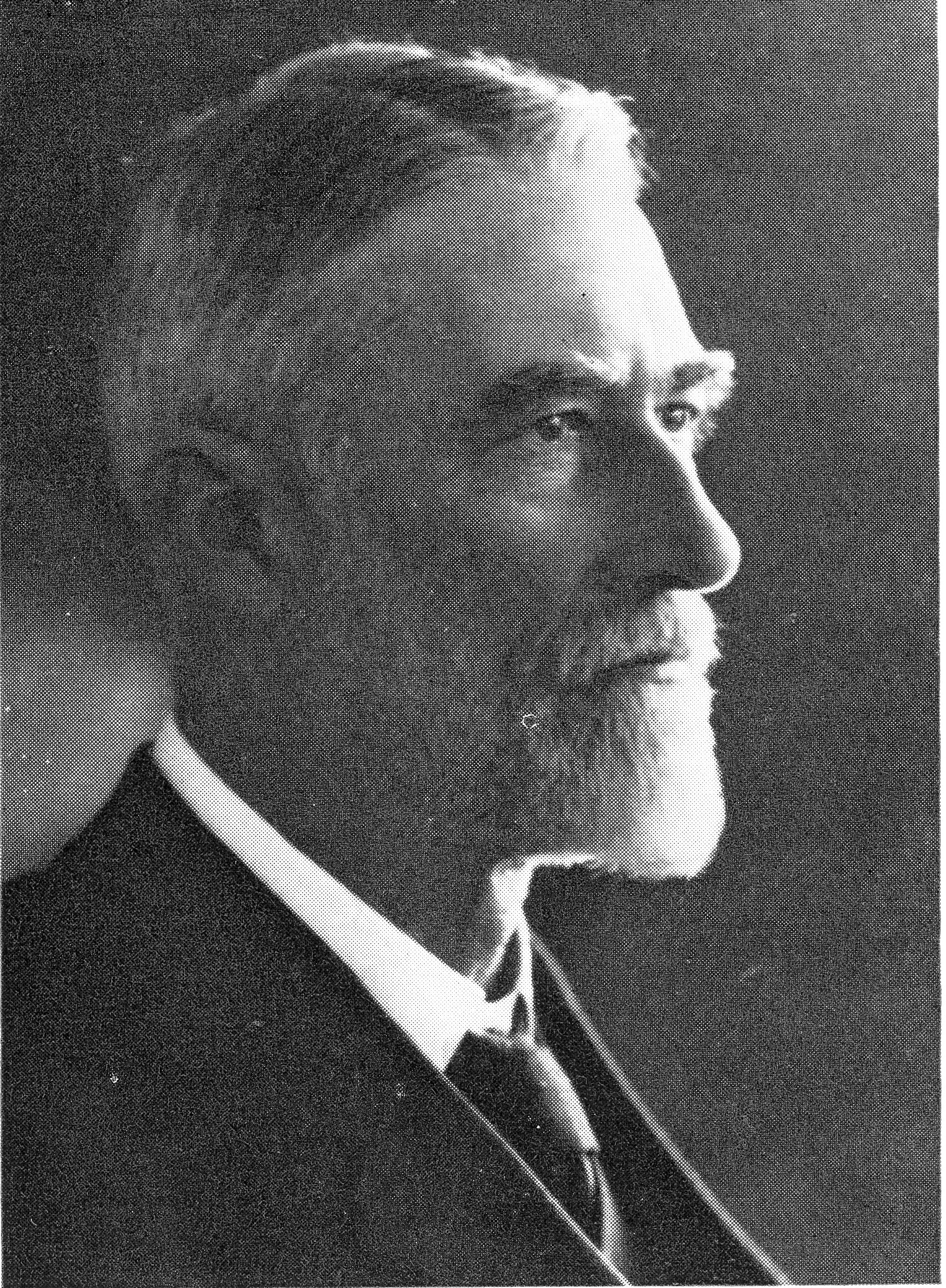
H.M. Beatty

Other differences were the boiler pitch, which was raised to 7 feet 3 inches (2,210 millimetres), a boiler diameter which was increased to 4 feet 6 inches (1,372 millimetres), the total boiler heating surface which was increased to 1,095 square feet (101.7 square metres), tractive effort which was increased to 22,240 pounds-force (98.9 kilonewtons) and a factor of adhesion which was reduced to 3.928.

Visually obvious alterations were the smokebox saddle and the running boards. The distinctive covered smokebox saddle of earlier 7th Class locomotives was replaced with an exposed one. The running boards were no longer straight all the way through from buffer beam to cab end, but dipped ahead of the smokebox and beneath the cab, giving it the appearance of a Hendrie-designed locomotive.

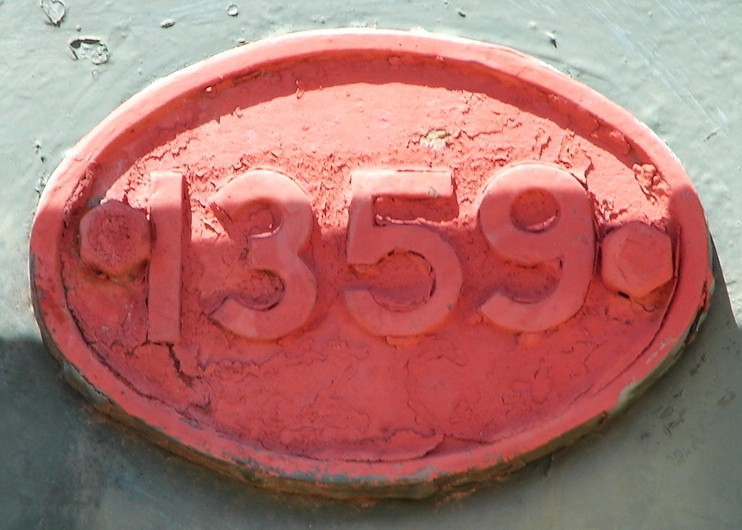
Tender number plate

The NCCR locomotives were equipped with a larger coal capacity version of the Type ZC tender. As built, the older version of the tender had a coal capacity of 5 long tons 10 hundredweight (5.6 tonnes), while the tenders to the NCCR 7th Class engines had a capacity of 6 long tons 10 hundredweight (6.6 tonnes). It had a maximum axle load of 9 long tons 1 hundredweight (9,195 kilograms) and, like the older version, a water capacity of 4,000 imperial gallons (18,200 litres; 4,800 US gallons).

These locomotives were capable of hauling 180 long tons (180 tonnes) from Ashton to Mosselbaai.

== Class 7 sub-classes ==
When the NCCR was amalgamated into the SAR in 1925, these three 7th Class locomotives were renumbered in the range from 1357 to 1359 on the SAR roster and designated Class 7F.

Other 7th Class locomotives which had come onto the SAR roster from the other railways in the Southern African region in 1912, namely the Cape Government Railways (CGR), Central South African Railways (CSAR), the Natal Government Railways (NGR) and the Rhodesia Railways (RR), as well as earlier NCCR 7th Class locomotive models, were grouped into six different sub-classes by the SAR, becoming SAR Classes 7 and 7A to 7E.

== Service ==
By November 1953 two Class 7s, one of which was ex NCCR Class 7F no. 1357, were still shedded at Touws River to work the Makadas on the Ladismith branch. It probably remained there until it was withdrawn and scrapped in April 1958. Its two sister engines, numbers 1358 and 1359, had both been withdrawn and scrapped in April 1950. The tender to no. 1359 survived and is now plinthed with Class 7 no. 970 at Riversdale.
