= South African type ZE tender =

Steam locomotive tender

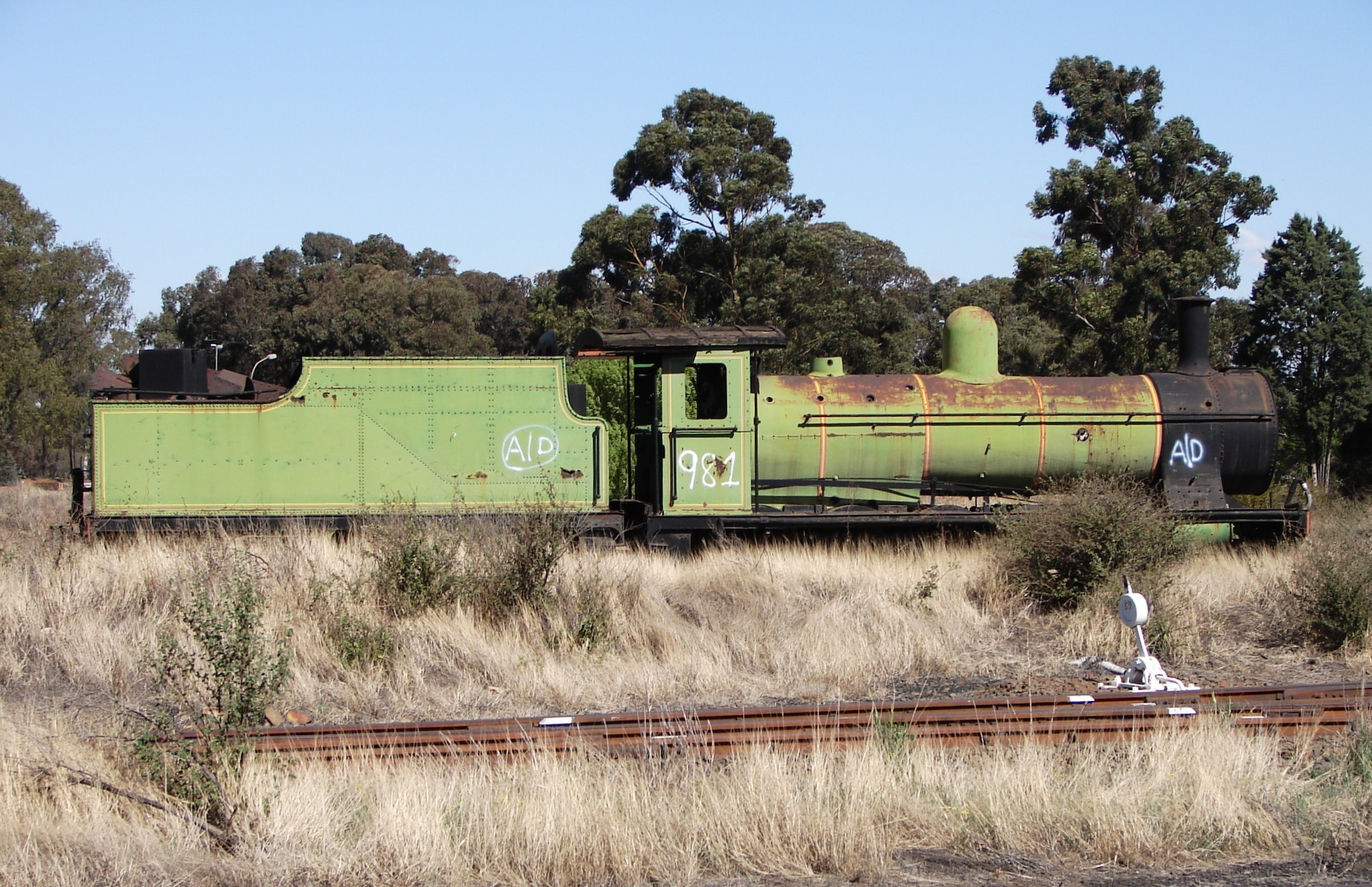
- Type ZE tender on SAR Class 7
Type and origin
- Locomotive: SAR Classes 7A, 7B & 7C
- Designer: South African Railways
- Builder: South African Railways
- In service: c. 1925
- Rebuilt from: Type ZC
Specifications
- Configuration: 2-axle bogies
- Gauge: 3 ft 6 in (1,067 mm) Cape gauge
- Length: 23 ft 8 7/8 in (7,236 mm)
- Wheel dia.: 34 in (864 mm)
- Wheelbase: 16 ft 1 in (4,902 mm)
  - Bogie: 4 ft 7 in (1,397 mm)
- Fuel type: Coal
- Fuel cap.: 8 LT (8.1 t)
- Water cap.: 2,850 imp gal (12,960 L)
- Stoking: Manual
- Couplers: Drawbar & Johnston link-and-pin Drawbar & AAR knuckle (1930s)
Career
- Operators: South African Railways
- Numbers: SAR 949, 988-1068

The South African type ZE tender was a steam locomotive tender.

Type ZE tenders were rebuilt from Type ZC tenders which had entered service between 1896 and 1902. The rebuilding resulted in a tender with a larger water tank and larger coal bunker.

== Origin ==
The original 7th Class locomotive and tender were designed in 1892 at the Salt River works in Cape Town, under the supervision of H.M. Beatty, the Cape Government Railways (CGR) Western System's Locomotive Superintendent at the time.

Type ZC tenders entered service as tenders to six 7th Class locomotive variants between 1896 and 1913, built by Dübs and Company, Kitson and Company, Neilson and Company, Neilson, Reid and Company, North British Locomotive Company and Sharp, Stewart and Company.

== Rebuilding ==
From c. 1925, several of the Type ZC tenders which had entered service with the Class 7A in 1896, the Class 7B in 1900 and the Class 7C in 1902, were completely rebuilt by the South African Railways (SAR), by mounting a new upper structure on the existing underframe, with larger water tanks and a larger coal capacity. These rebuilt tenders had a more modern appearance, with flush sides all the way to the top of the coal bunker. They were designated Type ZE.

The program to rebuild several older tender types with new upper structures was begun by Col F.R. Collins DSO, who approved several of the detailed drawings for the work during his term in office as Chief Mechanical Engineer (CME) of the SAR from 1922 to 1929. It was continued by his successor, A.G. Watson, CME from 1929 to 1936.

== Characteristics ==
The rebuilt tender had a coal capacity which had been increased from 5 long tons 10 hundredweight (5.6 tonnes) to 8 long tons (8.1 tonnes) and a water capacity which had been increased from 2,600 to 2,850 imperial gallons (11,820 to 12,960 litres).

== Classification letters ==
Since many tender types are interchangeable between different locomotive classes and types, a tender classification system was adopted by the SAR. The first letter of the tender type indicates the classes of engines to which it could be coupled. The "Z_" tenders could be used with the locomotive classes as shown.

- CGR 7th Class of 1892, SAR Class 7.
- CGR 7th Class of 1896, SAR Class 7A.
- Imperial Military Railways 7th Class, SAR Class 7B.
- CGR 7th Class of 1902, SAR Class 7C.
- Rhodesia Railways 7th Class, SAR Class 7D.
- New Cape Central Railway 7th Class of 1899, SAR Class 7E.
- New Cape Central Railway 7th Class of 1913, SAR Class 7F.

The second letter indicates the tender's water capacity. The "_E" tenders had a capacity of between 2,800 and 2,855 imperial gallons (12,730 and 12,980 litres; 3,363 and 3,429 US gallons).

== Illustration ==
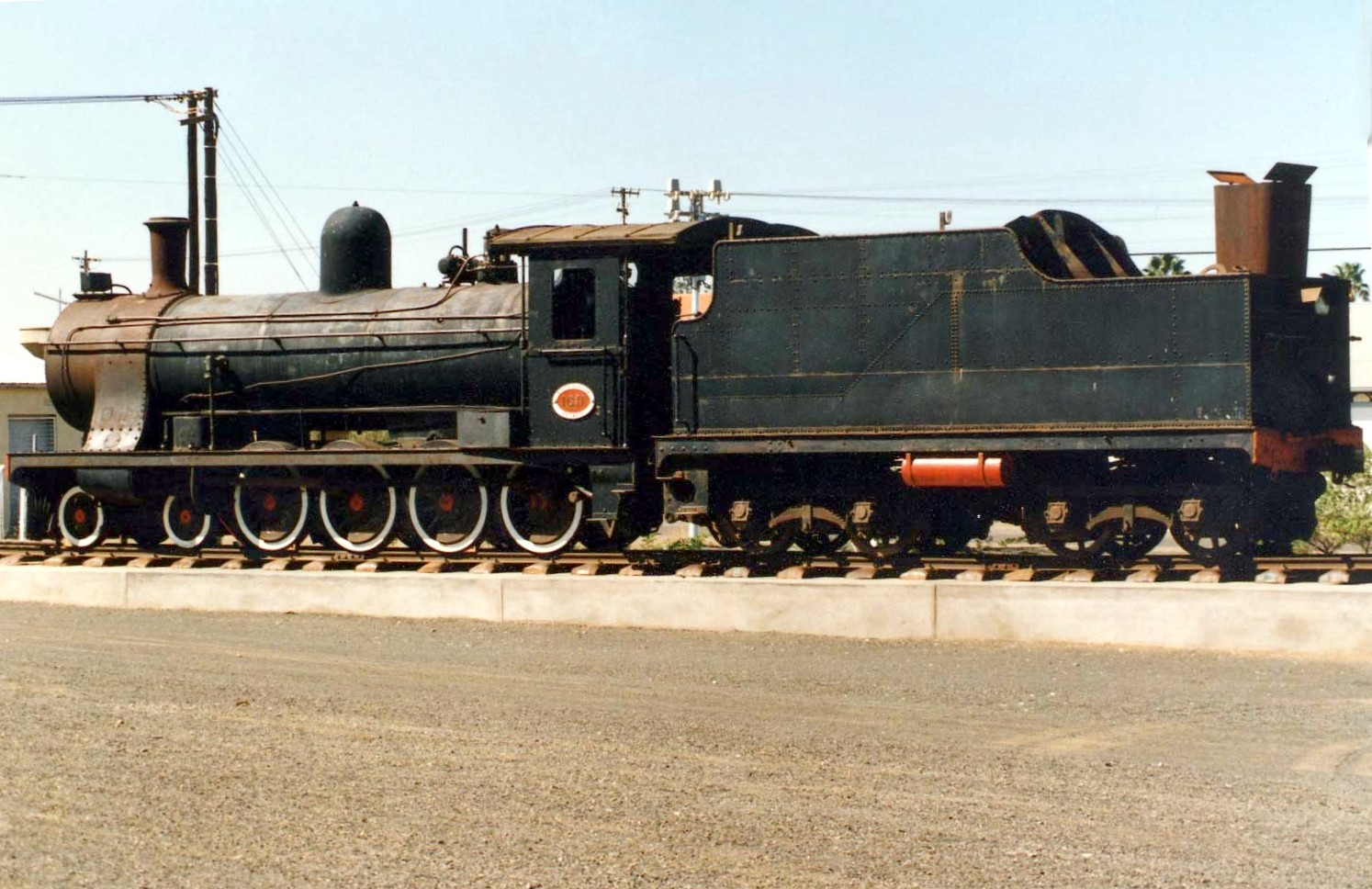
Type ZE tender on Class 7A, plinthed at Keetmanshoop, c. 1989
