= South African type ZC tender =

Steam locomotive

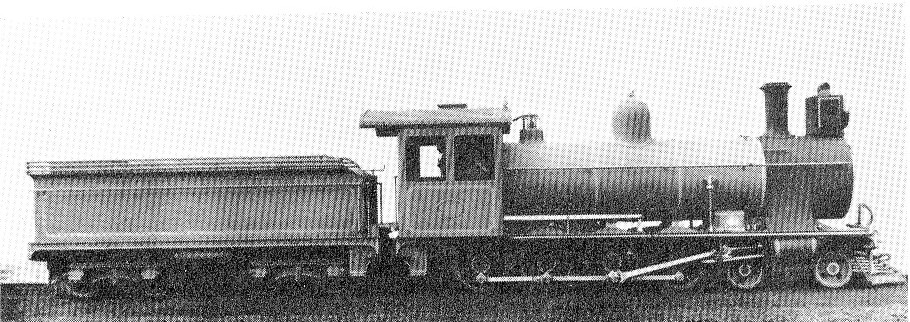
- Type ZC tender (5½ LT) on CGR 7th Class of 1902
Type and origin
- ♠ 5½ long tons coal capacity ♥ 6½ long tons coal capacity
- Locomotive: ♠ CGR 7th Class of 1896 ♠ CGR 7th Class of 1902 ♠ IMR 7th Class ♥ NCCR 7th Class of 1899 ♥ NCCR 7th Class of 1913 ♠ RR 7th Class
- Designer: Cape Government Railways (H.M. Beatty)
- Builder: ♠ Dübs and Company ♠ Kitson and Company ♠ Neilson and Company ♠♥ Neilson, Reid and Company ♠♥ North British Locomotive Co. ♠ Sharp, Stewart and Company
- In service: ♠ 1896-1902 - ♥ 1899-1913
- Rebuilder: South African Railways
- Rebuild date: c. 1925
- Rebuilt to: Type ZE
Specifications
- Configuration: 2-axle bogies
- Gauge: 3 ft 6 in (1,067 mm) Cape gauge
- Length: 23 ft 8 7/8 in (7,236 mm)
- Wheel dia.: 33 1/2 in (851 mm) as built 34 in (864 mm) retyred
- Wheelbase: 16 ft 1 in (4,902 mm)
  - Bogie: 4 ft 7 in (1,397 mm)
- Axle load: ♠ 8 LT 10 cwt 2 qtr (8,662 kg) av. ♥ 9 LT 1 cwt (9,195 kg)
  - Front bogie: ♥ 17 LT 8 cwt (17,680 kg)
  - Rear bogie: ♥ 18 LT 2 cwt (18,390 kg)
- Weight empty: ♥ 38,960 lb (17,670 kg)
- Weight w/o: ♠ 34 LT 2 cwt (34,650 kg) ♥ 35 LT 10 cwt (36,070 kg)
- Fuel type: Coal
- Fuel cap.: ♠ 5 LT 10 cwt (5.6 t) ♥ 6 LT 10 cwt (6.6 t)
- Water cap.: 2,600 imp gal (11,800 L)
- Stoking: Manual
- Couplers: Drawbar & Johnston link-and-pin Drawbar & AAR knuckle (1930s)
Career
- Operators: Cape Government Railways; Bechuanaland Railway; Imperial Military Railways; Imvani-Indwe Railway; New Cape Central Railway; Rhodesia Railways; South African Railways; Sudan Military Railway
- Numbers: SAR 949, 988-1068, 1344-1355, 1357-1359

The South African type ZC tender was a steam locomotive tender from the pre-Union era in the Cape of Good Hope.

The Type ZC tender first entered service in 1896, as tenders to the second version of the 7th Class 4-8-0 Mastodon type steam locomotive to be acquired by the Cape Government Railways. These locomotives were designated Class 7A on the South African Railways in 1912.

== Manufacturers ==
Type ZC tenders were built between 1896 and 1913 by Dübs and Company, Kitson and Company, Neilson and Company, Neilson, Reid and Company, North British Locomotive Company and Sharp, Stewart and Company.

The original 7th Class locomotive and tender had been designed at the Salt River works of the Cape Government Railways (CGR) in Cape Town in 1892, under the supervision of H.M. Beatty, the CGR Western System's Locomotive Superintendent. Between 1896 and 1901, the CGR placed 46 more 7th Class locomotives in service, which would be designated Class 7A on the South African Railways (SAR) in 1912.

The Type ZC first entered service in 1896 as tenders to these locomotives. Until 1913, all further 7th Class locomotives which were acquired by the CGR, Imperial Military Railways (IMR), Rhodesia Railways (RR) and New Cape Central Railway (NCCR) were delivered with Type ZC tenders.

A second version of the Type ZC tender, with a larger coal capacity, entered service on the NCCR as tenders to its 7th Class locomotives of 1899-1904 and 1913, which would respectively be designated Classes 7E and 7F on the SAR in 1925.

== Characteristics ==
As built, the first version of the tender had a coal capacity of 5 long tons 10 hundredweight (5.6 tonnes), while the second had a capacity of 6 long tons 10 hundredweight (6.6 tonnes), with maximum axle loads of 8 long tons 10 hundredweight 2 quarters (8,662 kilograms) and 9 long tons 1 hundredweight (9,195 kilograms) respectively. Both versions had a water capacity of 4,000 imperial gallons (18,200 litres).

== Locomotives ==
In the SAR years, tenders were numbered for the engines they were delivered with. In most cases, an oval number plate, bearing the engine number and often also the locomotive class or tender type, would be attached to the rear end of the tender. During the classification and renumbering of locomotives onto the SAR roster in 1912, no separate classification and renumbering list was published for tenders, which should have been renumbered according to the locomotive renumbering list.

Six locomotive classes were delivered new with Type ZC tenders, built by six manufacturers. Bearing in mind that tenders could and did migrate between engines, the tenders should have been numbered in the SAR number ranges as shown.

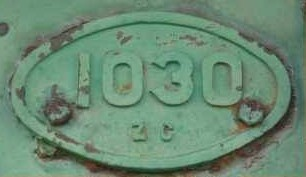

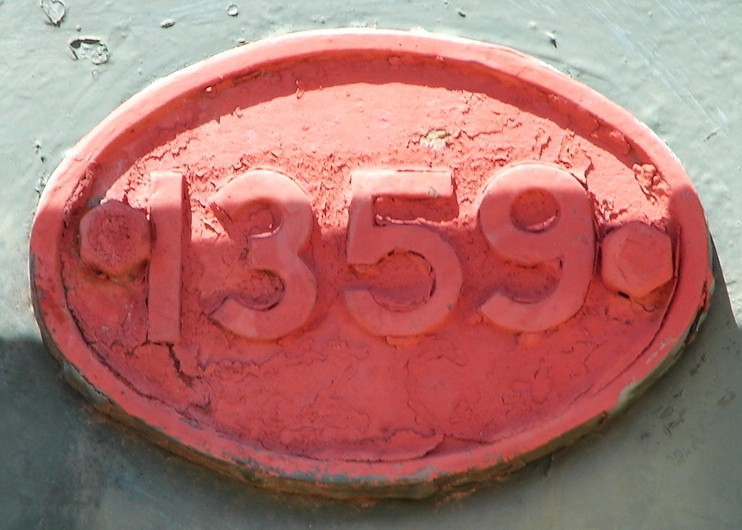

5½ long tons coal capacity

- 1896: CGR 7th Class of 1896, SAR Class 7A, numbers 988 to 1031.
- 1899: RR 7th Class, SAR Class 7D, numbers 1351 to 1355.
- 1900: IMR 7th Class, SAR Class 7B, numbers 949 and 1032 to 1058.
- 1902: CGR 7th Class of 1902, SAR Class 7C, numbers 1059 to 1068.

6½ long tons coal capacity

- 1899: NCCR 7th Class of 1899, SAR Class 7E, numbers 1344 to 1350.
- 1913: NCCR 7th Class of 1913, SAR Class 7F, numbers 1357 to 1359.

== Classification letters ==
Since many tender types are interchangeable between different locomotive classes and types, a tender classification system was adopted by the SAR. The first letter of the tender type indicates the classes of engines to which it could be coupled. The "Z_" tenders could be used with the locomotive classes as shown.

- CGR 7th Class of 1892, SAR Class 7.
- CGR 7th Class of 1896, SAR Class 7A.
- IMR 7th Class, SAR Class 7B.
- CGR 7th Class of 1902, SAR Class 7C.
- RR 7th Class, SAR Class 7D.
- NCCR 7th Class of 1899, SAR Class 7E.
- NCCR 7th Class of 1913, SAR Class 7F.

The second letter indicates the tender's water capacity. The "_C" tenders had a capacity of between 2,590 and 2,600 imperial gallons (11,770 and 11,820 litres; 3,110 and 3,122 US gallons).

== Modifications and rebuilding ==
=== Modifications ===
When the need arose, the coal capacity of tenders was sometimes increased by makeshift means, such as constructing wooden extensions for the bunker sides. In the example depicted, the Cape of Good Hope Governor's train is shown arriving in Fort Beaufort behind CGR 7th Class no. 722 for the official opening of the railway station in 1904. The engine's Type ZC tender's sides had been raised by installing what appears to be planking, to allow a greater coal load. In addition, an open gondola-type goods truck between the tender and the passenger carriage is loaded with more coal and two workmen.

More permanent modifications to increase coal capacity were in the form of a slatted cage mounted on top of the coal bunker and, in later years, a sheet-metal extension to raise the bunker sides.

=== Rebuilding to Type ZE ===
From c. 1925, several of the Type ZC tenders which had entered service with the Class 7A in 1896, the Class 7B in 1900 and the Class 7C in 1902, were completely rebuilt by the SAR by mounting a new upper structure on the existing underframe, with larger water tanks and a larger coal capacity. These rebuilt tenders had a more modern appearance with flush sides all the way to the top of the coal bunker. They were designated Type ZE.

The program to rebuild several older tender types with new upper structures was begun by Col F.R. Collins DSO, who approved several of the detailed drawings for the work during his term in office as Chief Mechanical Engineer of the SAR from 1922 to 1929. It was continued by his successor, A.G. Watson.

== Illustration ==
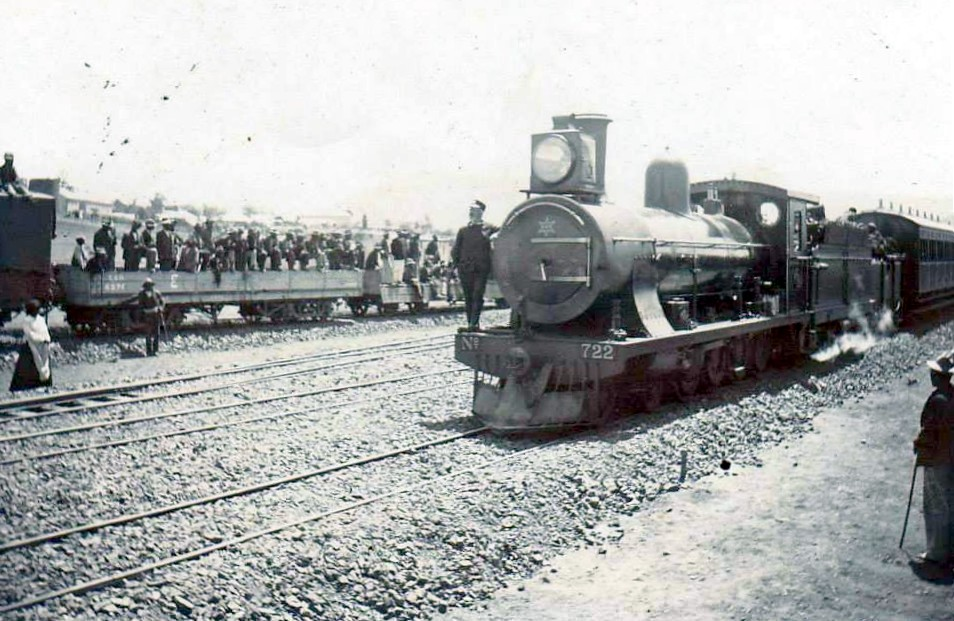
Makeshift modified Type ZC on CGR 7th of 1896, c. 1904

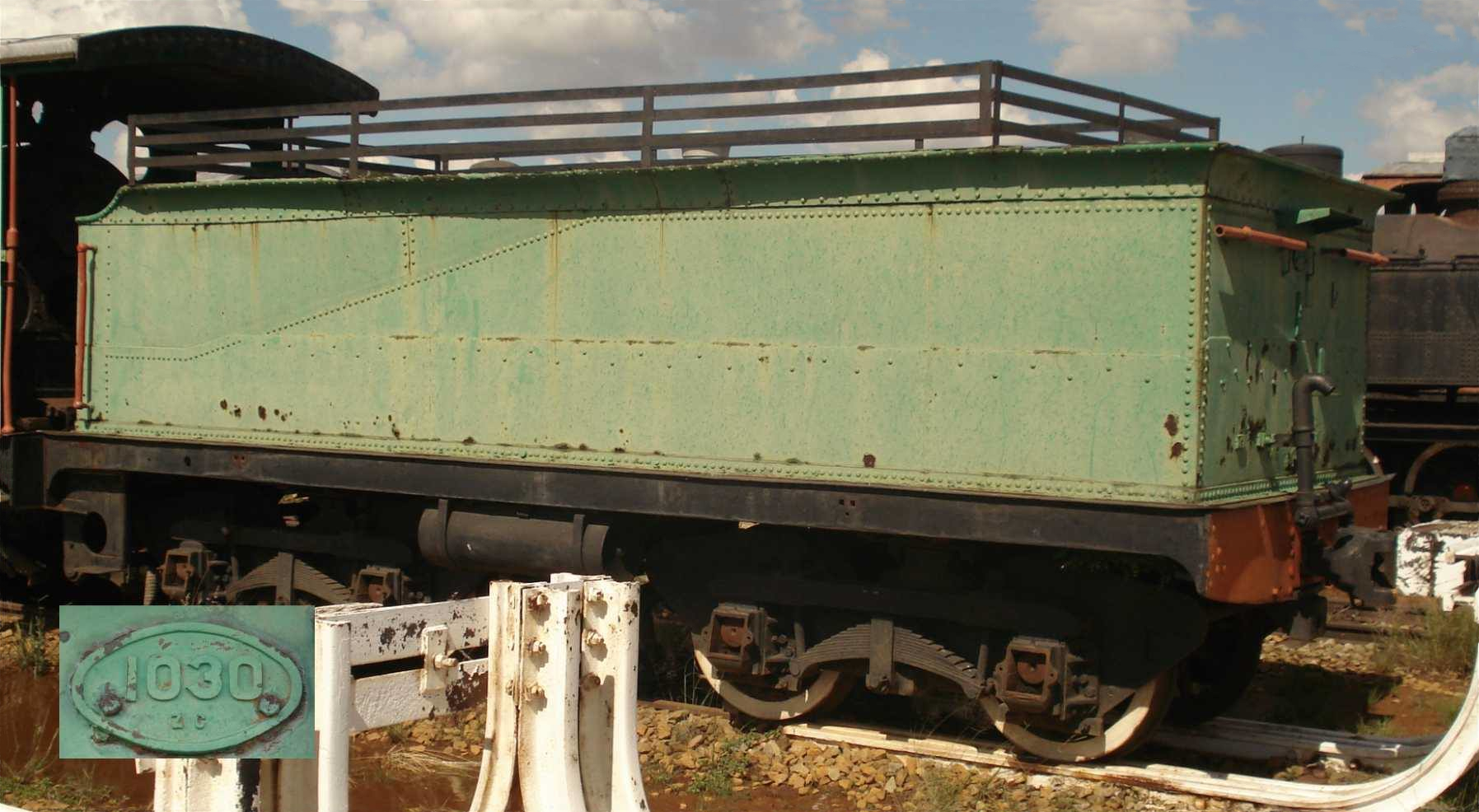
Type ZC no. 1030 with slatted coal bunker top, c. 2000

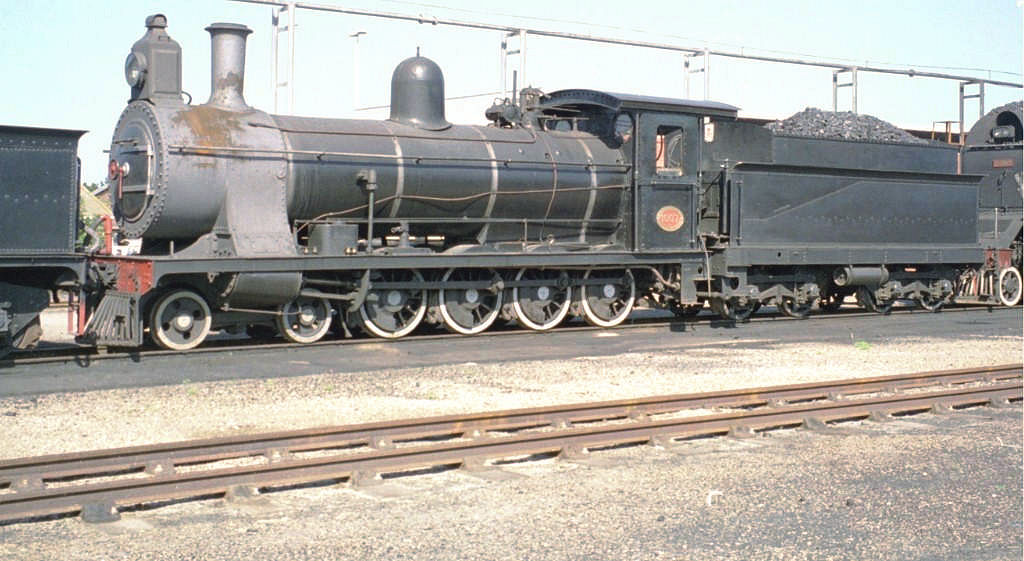
Modified Type ZC on SAR Class 7A, 1997

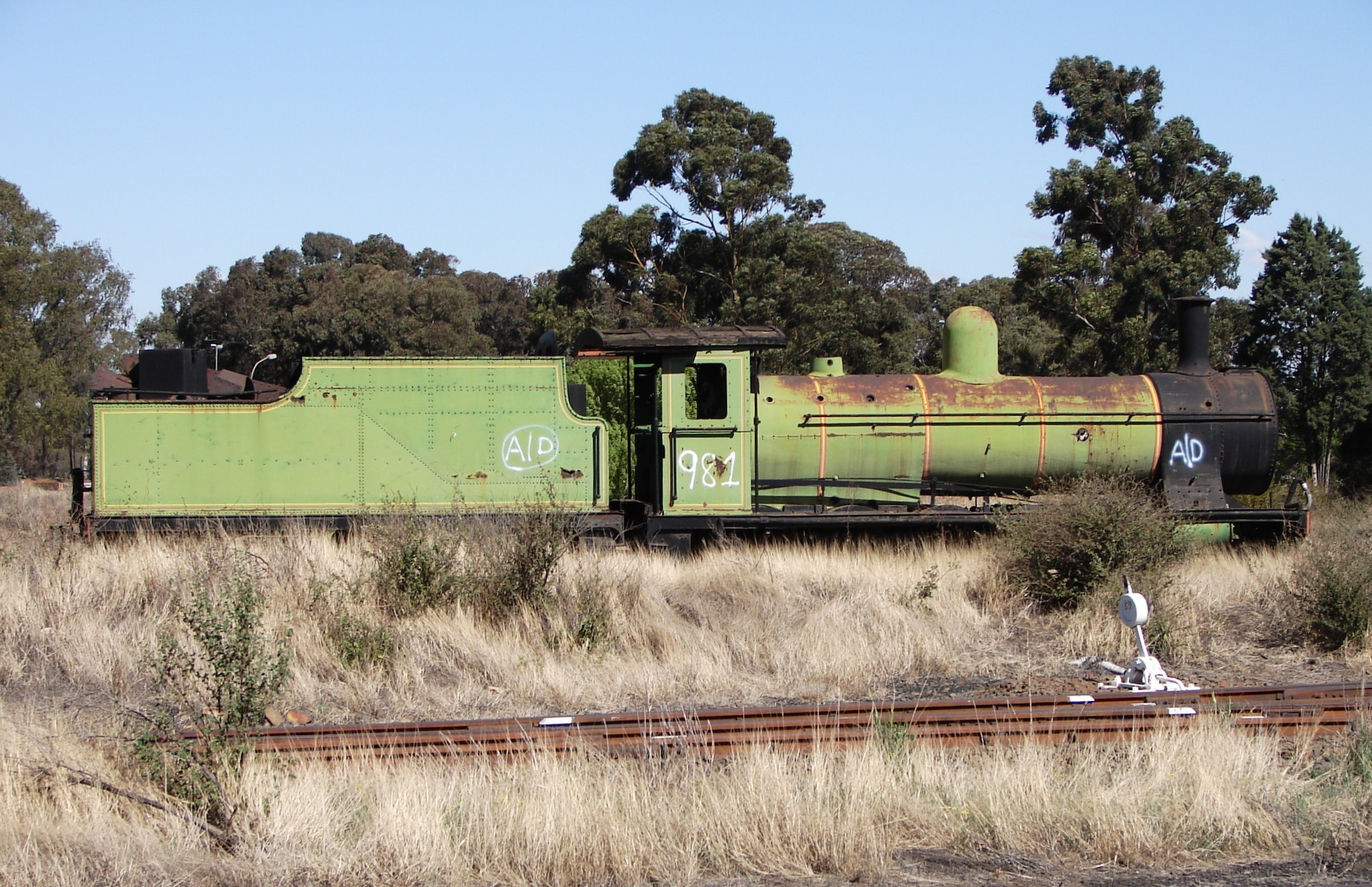
Rebuilt Type ZE on SAR Class 7, 2015
