= South African Class 7A 4-8-0 =

1896 design of steam locomotive

CGR 7th Class 4-8-0 1896 Sudan Railways Dongola Class South African Class 7A & 7AS 4-8-0
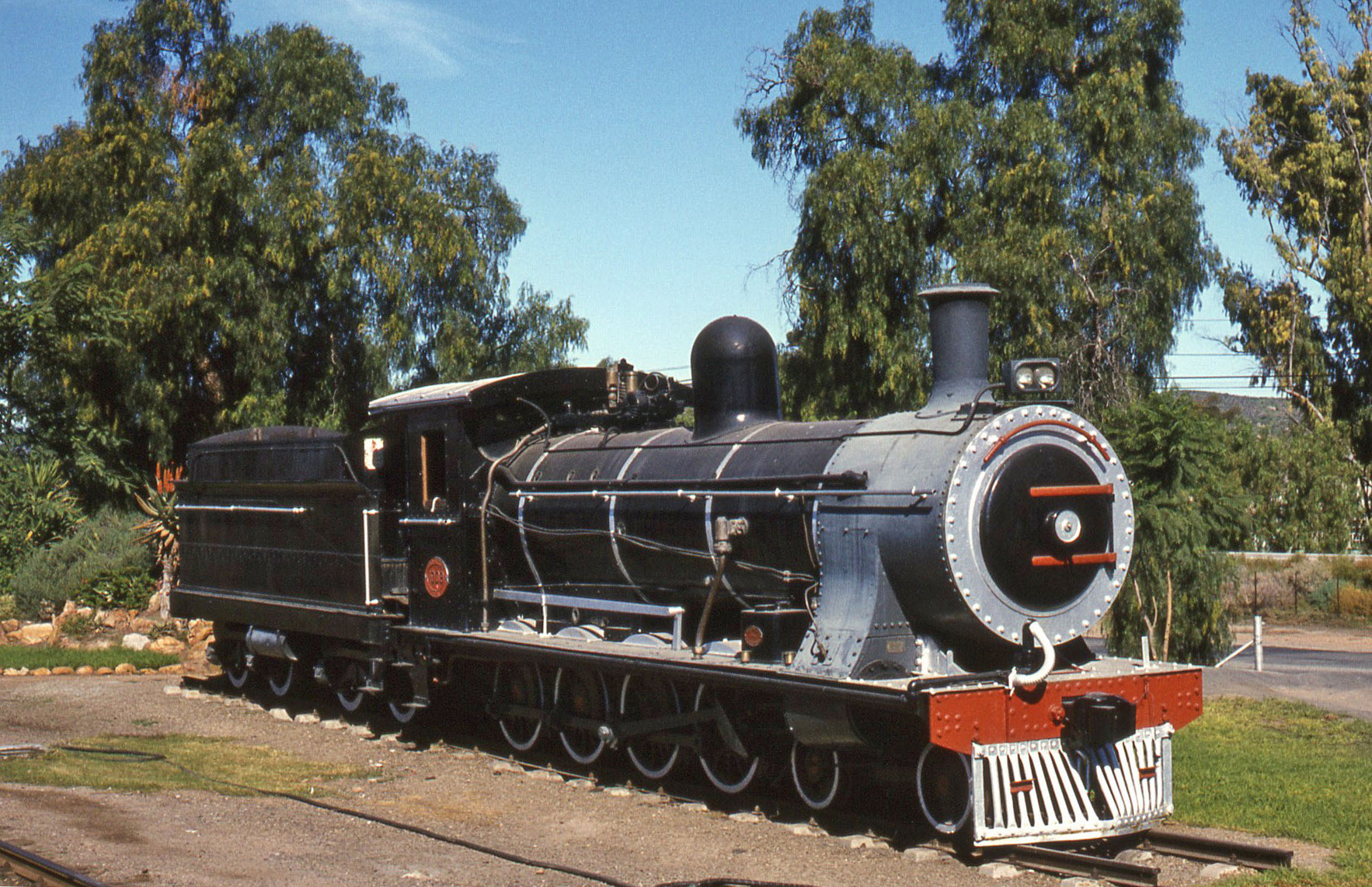
- Ex CGR (Eastern System) 7th Class no. 726; SAR Class 7A no. 1009 with modified Type ZC tender
Type and origin
- ♠ – Original locomotive, as built ♥ – Locomotive equipped with superheating
- Power type: Steam
- Designer: Cape Government Railways (H.M. Beatty)
- Builder: Sharp, Stewart and Company; Dübs and Company; Neilson and Company
- Serial number: Sharp, Stewart 4145–4152, 4363; Dübs 3355–3362, 3641–3652, 3976; Neilson 4920–4931, 5160–5163, 5232–5234, 5280–5281, 5345–5347
- Model: CGR 7th Class
- Build date: 1896–1898, 1901
- Total produced: 46
Specifications
- Configuration
  - Whyte: 4-8-0 (Mastodon)
  - UIC: ♠ 2'Dn2 – ♥ 2'Dh2
- Driver: 2nd coupled axle
- Gauge: 3 ft 6 in (1,067 mm) Cape gauge
- Leading dia.: 28 1/2 in (724 mm)
- Coupled dia.: 42 3/4 in (1,086 mm)
- Tender wheels: 33 1/2 in (851 mm) as built 34 in (864 mm) retyred
- Wheelbase: 46 ft 2 in (14,072 mm)
  - Engine: 21 ft 3 1/2 in (6,490 mm)
  - Leading: 5 ft 3 in (1,600 mm)
  - Coupled: 12 ft (3,658 mm)
  - Tender: 16 ft 1 in (4,902 mm)
  - Tender bogie: 4 ft 7 in (1,397 mm)
- Length
  - Over couplers: 53 ft 5 1/4 in (16,288 mm)
- Height: 12 ft 10 in (3,912 mm)
- Frame type: Plate
- Axle load: ♠ 9 LT (9,144 kg) ♥ 9 LT 14 cwt (9,856 kg)
  - Leading: ♠ 10 LT 14 cwt (10,870 kg) ♥ 11 LT 2 cwt (11,280 kg)
  - 1st coupled: ♠ 9 LT (9,144 kg) ♥ 9 LT 8 cwt (9,551 kg)
  - 2nd coupled: ♠ 9 LT (9,144 kg) ♥ 9 LT 14 cwt (9,856 kg)
  - 3rd coupled: ♠ 8 LT 18 cwt (9,043 kg) ♥ 9 LT 10 cwt (9,652 kg)
  - 4th coupled: ♠ 8 LT 18 cwt (9,043 kg) ♥ 9 LT 8 cwt (9,551 kg)
  - Tender axle: 8 LT 10 cwt 2 qtr (8,662 kg) av.
- Adhesive weight: ♠ 35 LT 16 cwt (36,370 kg) ♥ 37 LT 16 cwt (38,410 kg)
- Loco weight: ♠ 46 LT 10 cwt (47,250 kg) ♥ 49 LT 2 cwt (49,890 kg)
- Tender weight: 34 LT 2 cwt (34,650 kg)
- Total weight: ♠ 80 LT 12 cwt (81,890 kg) ♥ 83 LT 4 cwt (84,540 kg)
- Tender type: ZC (2-axle bogies); ZA, ZB, ZC, ZE permitted
- Fuel type: Coal
- Fuel capacity: 5 LT 10 cwt (5.6 t)
- Water cap.: 2,600 imp gal (11,800 L)
- Firebox
  - Type: Round-top
  - Grate area: ♠ 17.5 sq ft (1.63 m^{2}) ♥ 18 sq ft (1.7 m^{2})
- Boiler
  - Pitch: ♠ 6 ft 8 in (2,032 mm) pitch ♥ 6 ft 10 in (2,083 mm)
  - Diameter: ♠ 4 ft 4 in (1,321 mm) ♥ 4 ft 6 in (1,372 mm)
  - Tube plates: ♠♥ 10 ft 9 in (3,277 mm)
  - Small tubes: ♠ 185: 1 7/8 in (48 mm) ♥ 100: 1 7/8 in (48 mm)
  - Large tubes: ♥ 18: 5 1/2 in (140 mm)
- Boiler pressure: ♠ 160 psi (1,103 kPa); 170 psi (1,172 kPa) adjusted ♥ 180 psi (1,241 kPa)
- Safety valve: Ramsbottom
- Heating surface
  - Firebox: ♠ 102 sq ft (9.5 m^{2}) ♥ 113 sq ft (10.5 m^{2})
  - Tubes: ♠ 976 sq ft (90.7 m^{2}) ♥ 806 sq ft (74.9 m^{2})
  - Total surface: ♠ 1,078 sq ft (100.1 m^{2}) ♥ 919 sq ft (85.4 m^{2})
- Superheater
  - Heating area: ♥ 206 sq ft (19.1 m^{2})
- Cylinders: Two
- Cylinder size: 17 in (432 mm) bore 23 in (584 mm) stroke
- Valve gear: Stephenson
- Valve type: ♠ Slide – ♥ Piston
- Couplers: Johnston link-and-pin AAR knuckle (1930s)
Performance figures
- Tractive effort: ♠ 18,660 lbf (83.0 kN) @ 75% ♠ 19,810 lbf (88.1 kN) @ 75% adjusted ♥ 22,240 lbf (98.9 kN) @ 75%
- Factor of adh.: 4.3
Career
- Operators: Cape Government Railways; Bechuanaland Railway; Imperial Military Railways; Imvani-Indwe Railway; Sudan Military Railway; South African Railways; Zambesi Saw Mills
- Class: CGR 7th Class, SAR Class 7A
- Number in class: 46 CGR, 44 SAR
- Numbers: CGR 347–350, 385–398, 718–744, 758; BR 4–7; IMR C522, C523 & C525-C527; Imvani-Indwe: Named; SAR 988–1031; Sudan 26–33
- Delivered: 1896–1901
- First run: 1896
- Withdrawn: 1972
- The leading coupled axle had flangeless wheels

The South African Railways Class 7A 4-8-0 of 1896 was a steam locomotive from the pre-Union era in the Cape of Good Hope.

Between 1896 and 1901, the Cape Government Railways placed a second batch of altogether 46 7th Class steam locomotives with a 4-8-0 Mastodon wheel arrangement in service on its Midland and Eastern Systems. In 1912, when all but two of them were assimilated into the South African Railways, they were renumbered and designated Class 7A.

In 1897 and 1898, during Kitchener's military campaign in Sudan, eight Cape 7th Class locomotives were built to the same design for the Soudan Military Railway.

== Manufacturers ==
The original Cape 7th Class locomotive had been designed in 1892 by H.M. Beatty, at the time the Cape Government Railways (Western System) Locomotive Superintendent.

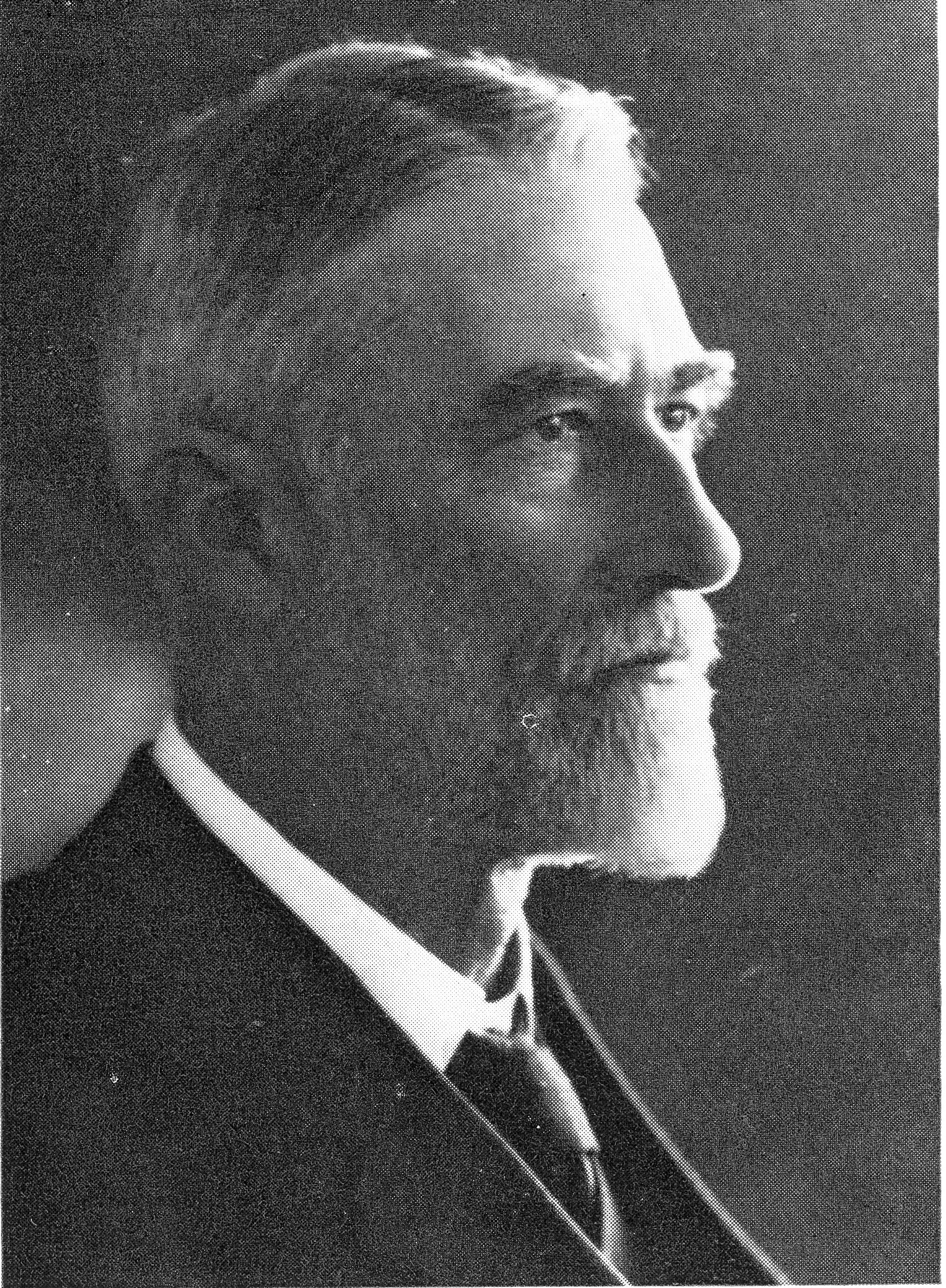
H.M. Beatty

Following on the 38 7th Class locomotives which were placed in service by the Cape Government Railways (CGR) between 1892 and 1893, a second batch of 46 slightly improved locomotives were acquired between 1896 and 1901. Outwardly, all these locomotives appeared almost identical to the first batch of 7th Class locomotives, but they had increased heating capacity as well as some other modifications. They were the first to be equipped with type ZC tenders, which rode on two two-axle bogies and had a capacity of 5 long tons 10 hundredweight (5.6 tonnes) of coal and 2,600 imperial gallons (11,800 litres) of water.

=== 1896 ===
In 1896, orders were placed for 28 locomotives, distributed between three manufacturers.

- Sharp, Stewart and Company built eight for the Midland System, numbered in the range from 385 to 392.
- Dübs and Company built eight for the Eastern System, numbered in the range from 718 to 723, 740 and 741.
- Neilson and Company built six for the Midland System, numbered in the range from 393 to 398, and another six for the Eastern System, numbered in the range from 724 to 729.

=== 1897 ===
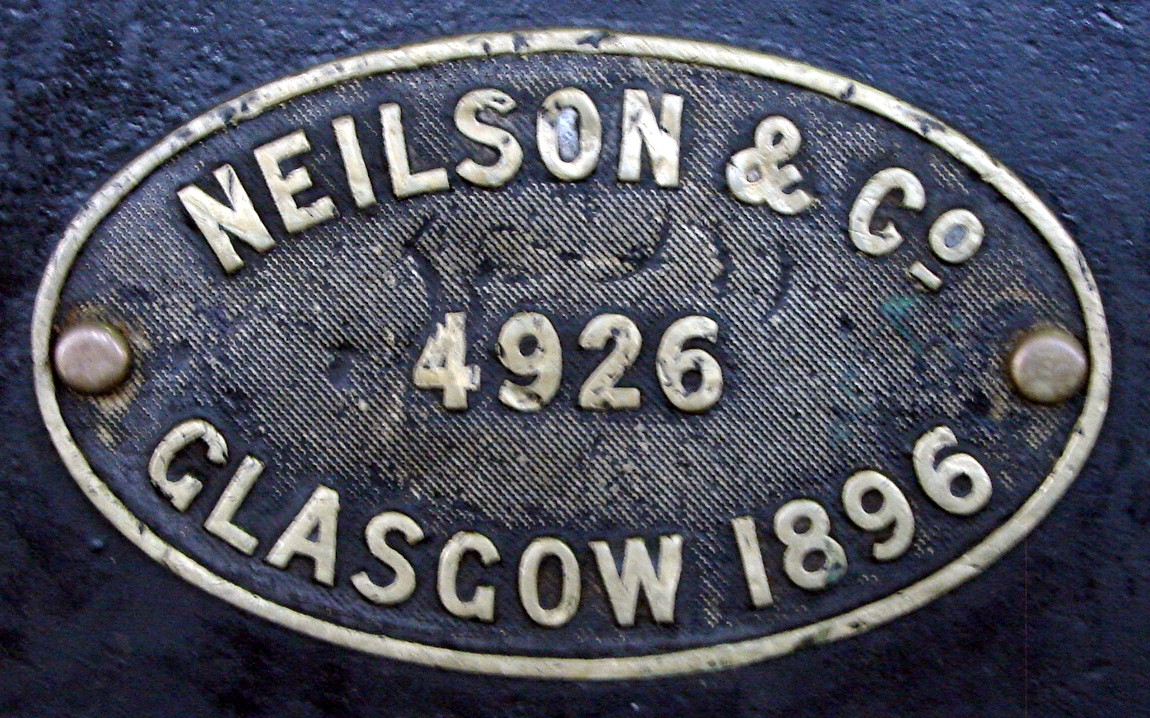

In 1897, a further four 7th Class locomotives were ordered by the CGR from Neilson, for use on the new Vryburg to Bulawayo line of the fledgling Bechuanaland Railway Company (BR). The line was still under construction and was operated by the CGR on behalf of the BR at the time. These 7th Class locomotives, numbered in the range from BR4 to BR7, were eventually returned to the CGR and renumbered in the range from 347 to 350 for the Midland System.

In 1897 and 1898, Neilson also built eight Cape 7th Class locomotives for the Soudan Military Railway, where they were known as the Dongola Class.

=== 1898 ===
In 1898, another ten 7th Class locomotives were taken into service by the CGR, as well as another three by the Imvani-Indwe Railway which operated a branch line from Sterkstroom to the Indwe Collieries in the Eastern Cape.

- Sharp Stewart built one 7th Class for the Imvani-Indwe, which was named E.J. Byrne by the colliery. It was eventually taken onto the CGR roster and became the Eastern System's no. 742.
- Dübs built two for the Imvani-Indwe, which were named Bradfield and Gardner Williams. They were also eventually taken onto the CGR roster and became the Eastern System's numbers 743 and 744 respectively.
- At the same time, Dübs built ten for the CGR, which were numbered in the range from 730 to 739 on the Eastern System.

=== 1901 ===
One more 7th Class locomotive was delivered by Dübs in 1901 and became the Eastern System's no. 758.

== Class 7 sub-classes ==
When the Union of South Africa was established on 31 May 1910, the three Colonial government railways (CGR, Natal Government Railways and Central South African Railways) were united under a single administration to control and administer the railways, ports and harbours of the Union. Although the South African Railways and Harbours came into existence in 1910, the actual classification and renumbering of all the rolling stock of the three constituent railways were only implemented with effect from 1 January 1912.

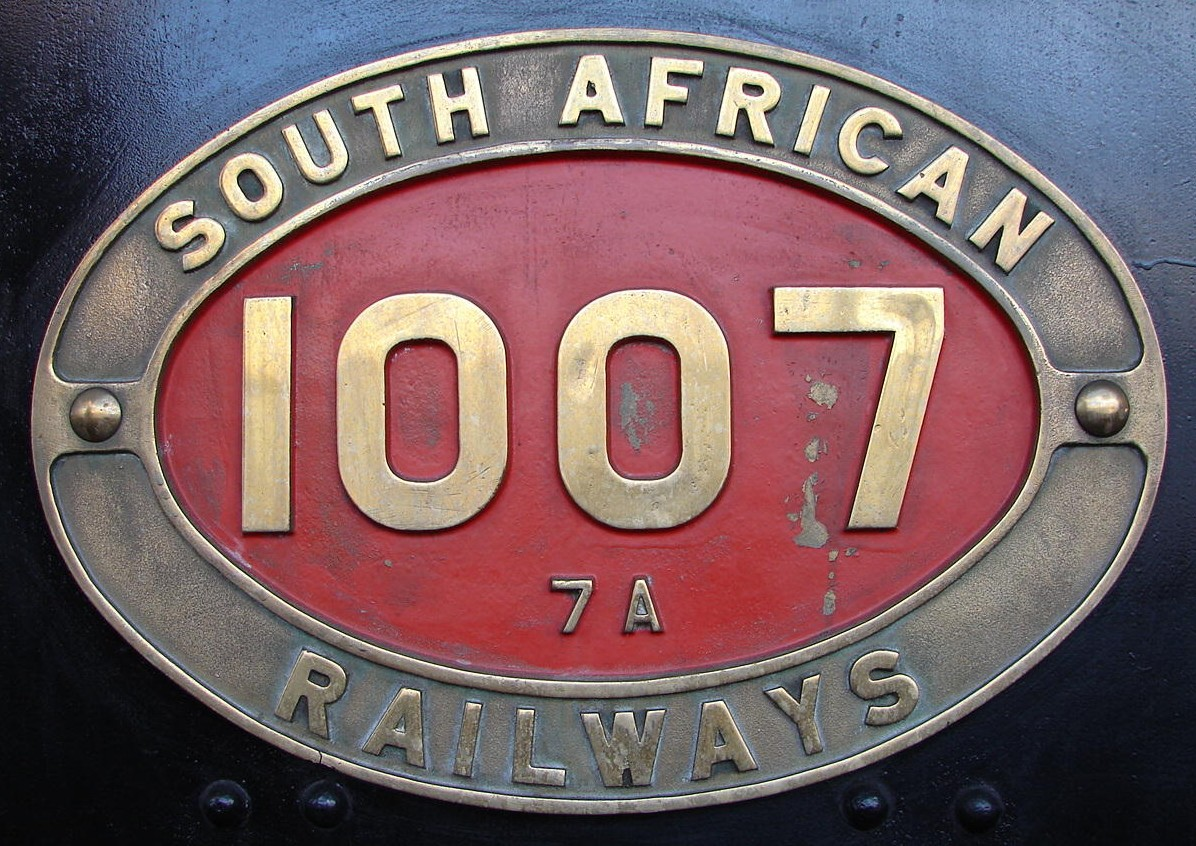

When all but two of these 46 locomotives were assimilated into the South African Railways (SAR) in 1912, they were renumbered in the range from 988 to 1031 and designated Class 7A. The two exceptions had been sold to Pauling and Company in 1909.

The rest of the CGR's 7th Class locomotives, together with 7th Class locomotives from the Central South African Railways (CSAR), the Pretoria-Pietersburg Railway (PPR), the Rhodesia Railways (RR), the Natal Government Railways (NGR) and, in 1925, the New Cape Central Railways (NCCR), were grouped into six different sub-classes by the SAR and designated Classes 7 and 7B to 7F.

== Modification ==
During the 1930s and later, many of the Class 7 series locomotives were equipped with superheated boilers and piston valves. On the Class 7B and Class 7C, this conversion was sometimes indicated with an "S" suffix to the class number on the locomotive's number plates, but on the rest of the Class 7 family this distinction was rarely applied. The superheated versions could be visually identified by the position of the chimney on the smokebox, the chimney having been displaced forward to provide space behind it in the smokebox for the superheater header.

In the early 1960s, Class 7A no. 1021 was reportedly equipped with a superheater and reclassified to the sole Class 7AS. The number plate was altered by weld-writing a crude "S" after the "7A". This locomotive spent its last working days on the SAR doing steam heating tests on mainline passenger coaches at the Braamfontein North passenger yard in Johannesburg, before being sold to the Zambesi Saw Mills (ZSM) in 1971. The ZSM engineer's records, however, show it as not superheated and having saturated boiler no. 7865.

== Renumbering ==
During their long service lives, some of the Class 7A locomotives underwent more than one renumbering. Five saw service with the Imperial Military Railways (IMR) during the Second Boer War and were temporarily renumbered accordingly, three were unnumbered, but named, while in Imvani-Indwe colliery service and all but two were eventually renumbered onto the SAR roster in 1912. Table 1 lists these renumberings as well as their builders and works numbers.

When the four BR locomotives, numbers BR 4 to BR 7, were eventually returned to CGR service and renumbered in the range from 347 to 350 for the Midland System, it resulted in number duplication which confused historians in later years. These four engine numbers had been used previously on four of the 1892 and 1893 batch of 7th Class locomotives, also built by Neilson, which had since been renumbered in the range from 712 to 715 when they were transferred from the Midland to the Eastern System.

Table 1 – Class 7A builders, works numbers and renumbering
Builder	Works No.	Year	CGR No.	IMR or BR No.	Imvani-Indwe or Sold	SAR No.
Neilson	5160	1897	347	BR 4		1015
Neilson	5161	1897	348	BR 5	Pauling & Co.	
Neilson	5162	1897	349	BR 6		1016
Neilson	5163	1897	350	BR 7		1017
Sharp Stewart	4145	1896	385			988
Sharp Stewart	4146	1896	386	C525		989
Sharp Stewart	4147	1896	387			990
Sharp Stewart	4148	1896	388			991
Sharp Stewart	4149	1896	389			992
Sharp Stewart	4150	1896	390			993
Sharp Stewart	4151	1896	391			994
Sharp Stewart	4152	1896	392			995
Neilson	4920	1896	393			996
Neilson	4921	1896	394			997
Neilson	4922	1896	395			998
Neilson	4923	1896	396	C522		999
Neilson	4924	1896	397			1000
Neilson	4925	1896	398		Pauling & Co.	
Dübs	3355	1896	718			1001
Dübs	3356	1896	719			1002
Dübs	3357	1896	720			1003
Dübs	3358	1896	721			1004
Dübs	3359	1896	722			1005
Dübs	3360	1896	723	C527		1006
Neilson	4926	1896	724			1007
Neilson	4927	1896	725			1008
Neilson	4928	1896	726			1009
Neilson	4929	1896	727	C526		1010
Neilson	4930	1896	728			1011
Neilson	4931	1896	729			1012
Dübs	3643	1898	730	C523		1018
Dübs	3644	1898	731			1019
Dübs	3645	1898	732			1020
Dübs	3646	1898	733			1021
Dübs	3647	1898	734			1022
Dübs	3648	1898	735			1023
Dübs	3649	1898	736			1024
Dübs	3650	1898	737			1025
Dübs	3651	1898	738			1026
Dübs	3652	1898	739			1027
Dübs	3361	1896	740			1013
Dübs	3362	1896	741			1014
Sharp Stewart	4363	1898	742		EJ Byrne	1028
Dübs	3641	1898	743		Bradfield	1029
Dübs	3642	1898	744		Gardner Williams	1030
Dübs	3976	1901	758			1031

== Service ==
=== South Africa ===
The 7th Class series became the main goods locomotive class for the last twenty years of the existence of the CGR. In SAR service, the Class 7 series worked on every system in the country. Of this second batch of the Class, not all began their service lives on the CGR, and not all remained with the CGR until the SAR came into existence. In summary:

- Four originally began their service lives on the BR, between Vryburg in the Cape Colony and Bulawayo in Southern Rhodesia, and were eventually returned to the CGR and renumbered 347 to 350 for the Cape Midland.
- Four from the 1896 and one from the 1898 batches saw service with the IMR during the Second Boer War from 1899 to 1902, having been allocated to the IMR for the duration of the war.
- Two locomotives, numbers 348 and 398, were sold to Pauling and Company in 1909, for use during the construction of the Rhodesia Katanga Junction Railway (RKJR) in Northern Rhodesia. The RKJR purchased them from Paulings in 1910, after which they went to the Mashonaland Railway Company in 1928, and eventually to the RR in 1936. They retained their CGR engine numbers for their entire working lives, until they were scrapped by the RR in 1938.
- The Imvani-Indwe Railway's three 7th Class engines were taken onto the CGR roster and numbered 742 to 744 for service on the Eastern System, before the 1912 amalgamation into the SAR.

=== South West Africa ===
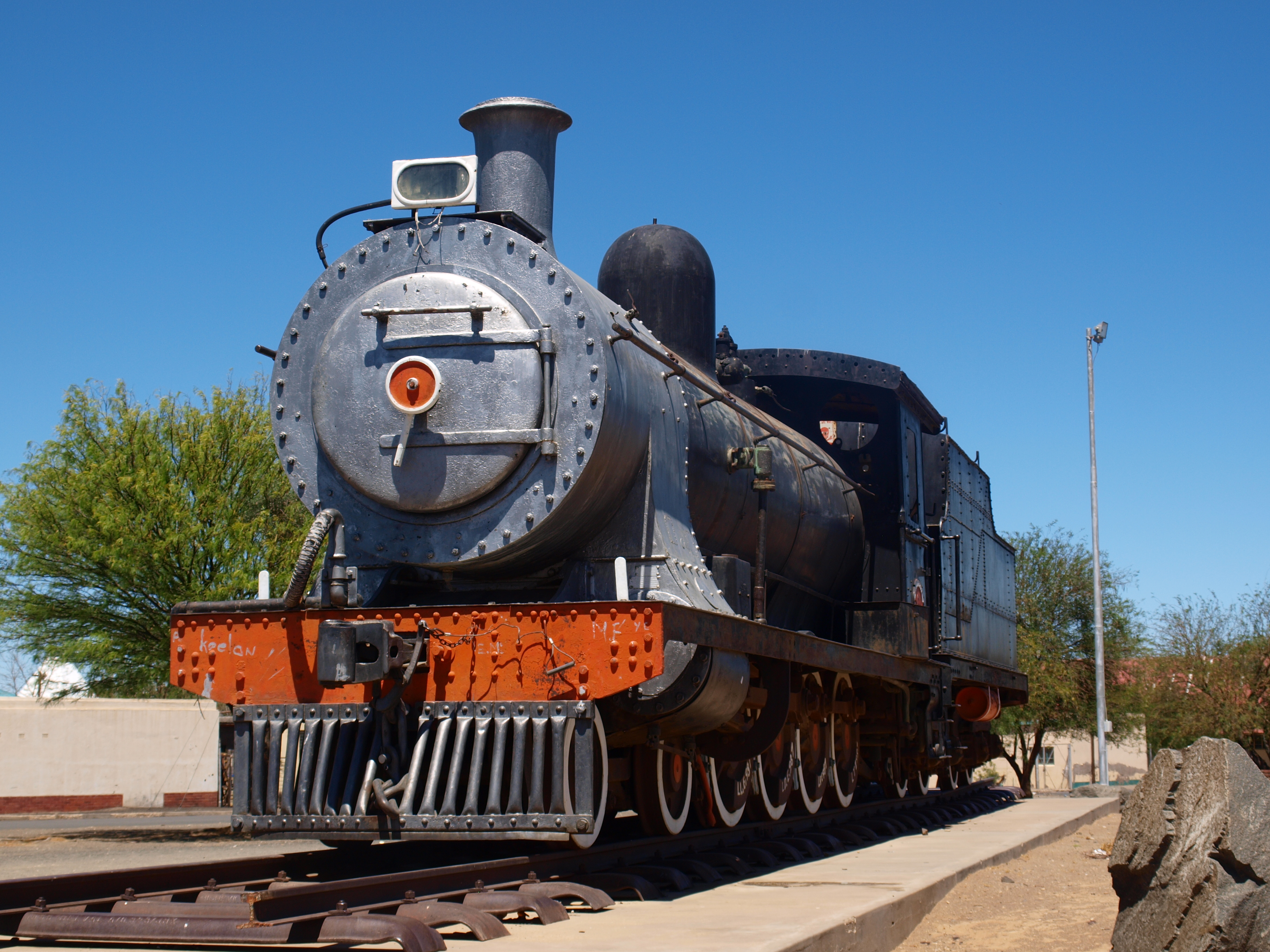
Nr. 1011 plinted in front of the station building of Keetmanshoop, Namibia.

In 1915, shortly after the outbreak of the First World War, the German South West Africa colony was occupied by the Union Defence Forces. Since a large part of the territory's railway infrastructure and rolling stock was destroyed or damaged by retreating German forces, an urgent need arose for locomotives for use on the Cape gauge lines in that territory. In 1917, numbers 1000 to 1002, 1005, 1006, 1017, 1019 and 1021 to 1024 were transferred to the Defence Department for service in South West Africa.

These eleven locomotives remained in South West Africa after the war. They proved to be so successful in that territory, that more were gradually transferred there in later years. By the time the Class 24 locomotives arrived in SWA in 1949, 53 locomotives of the Class 7 family were still in use there.

Most remained there, and were only transferred back to South Africa when the Class 32-000 diesel-electric locomotives replaced them in 1961. In South Africa, they remained in branchline service until they were finally withdrawn in 1972.

=== Industrial ===
Four Class 7A locomotives, numbers 992 and 1006 in 1966, and 993 and 1021 in 1971, as well as two Class 7 and two Class 7B locomotives were sold to the Zambesi Saw Mills (ZSM) in Zambia. The company worked the teak forests which stretched 100 miles (160 kilometres) to the north-west of Livingstone, where it built one of the longest logging railways in the world to serve its sawmill at Mulobezi. These eight locomotives joined eight ex RR 7th Class locomotives which had been acquired by the ZSM between 1925 and 1956.

Railway operations ceased at Mulobezi around 1972 and operation of the line to Livingstone was taken over by the Zambia Railways in 1973. While most of the Class 7 series locomotives remained at Mulobezi out of use, Class 7A no. 1021 was installed at the Livingstone factory to supply steam for curing wood.

=== Preservation ===
Number	Works nmr	THF / Private	Leaselend / Owner	Current Location	Outside South Africa	Image
993	SHARP STEWART 4150	Private	David Shepherd	National Railway Museum Shildon	England (United Kingdom)	No. 390
1007	NEILSON 4926	THF	Transnet Heritage Foundation	Outiniqua Transport Museum		No. 1007
1009	NEILSON 4928	THF	Transnet Heritage Foundation	Outiniqua Transport Museum		
1011	NEILSON 4930	Private	Plinth	Keetmanshoop (Station)	Namibia	
1019	DUBS 3644	THF		Witbank Locomotive Depot		
1029	DUBS 3641	THF	Plinth	Lydenburg (station)		

== Sudan's Dongola Class ==
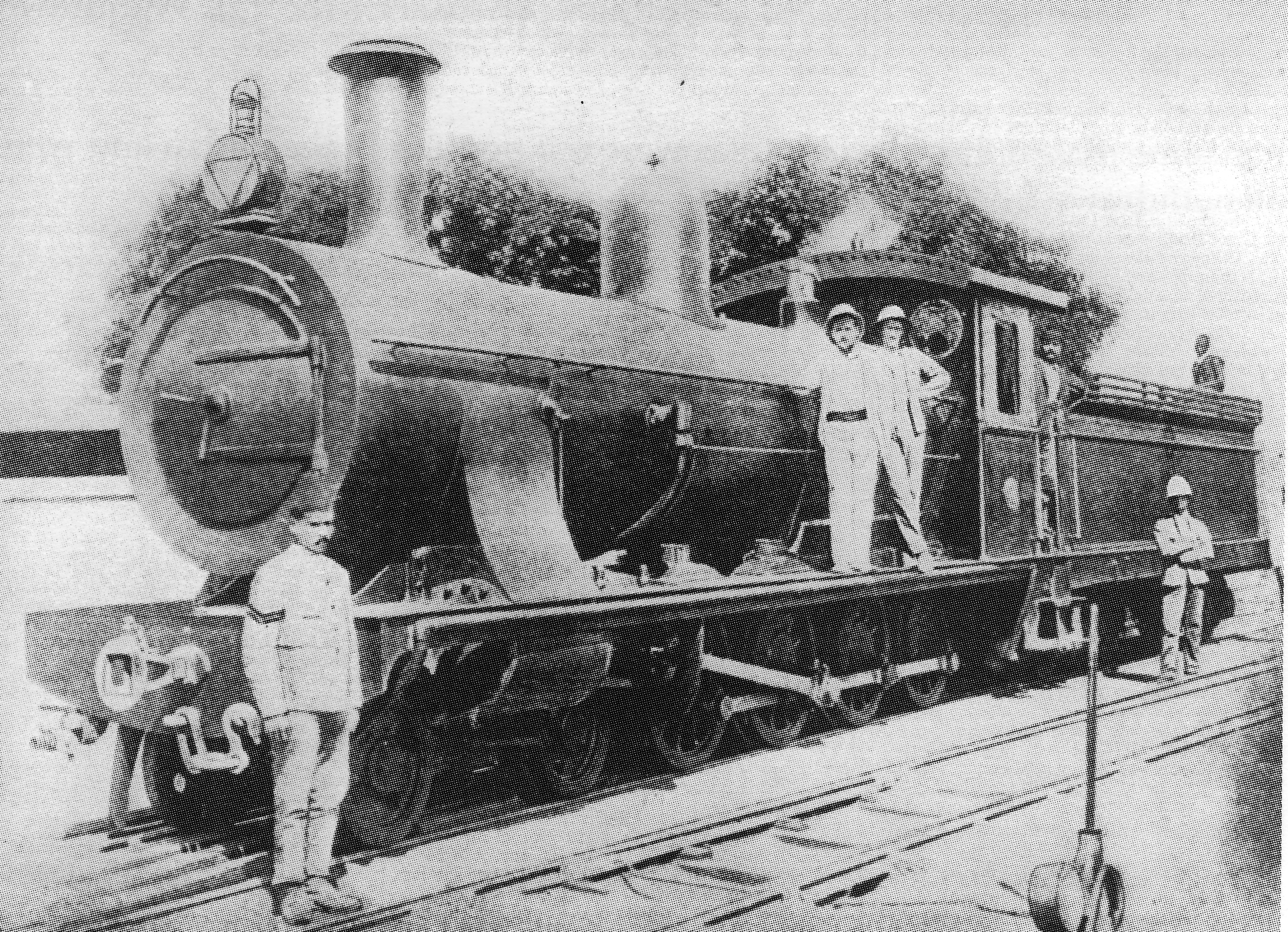
Sudan Dongola Class 4-8-0, c. 1898

Cape 7th Class locomotives were also built for the Soudan Military Railway during Kitchener's campaign in Sudan. When he arrived in the territory in 1895, he built a railway line, strictly for military purposes, running parallel to the Nile River for nearly 200 miles (322 kilometres) from Wadi Halfa to the Third Cataract at Kerma, and then another line from Wadi Halfa across 571 miles (919 kilometres) through the Nubian Desert to Atbarah and on to Khartoum to the south. For motive power, three Cape 7th Class locomotives, built to the Class 7A design and known as the Dongola Class in Sudan, were ordered from Neilson and delivered in 1897. These were followed by five more in two batches in 1898. They were initially not numbered, but named after places in Sudan.

Their works numbers, order numbers, names and eventual Sudan Railway (SR) numbers, are listed in Table 2. SR no. 29, which was originally named Berber according to Neilson's records, was later renamed Fashoda/Suakin.

Table 2 – Sudan Dongola Class Works numbers, names and numbers
Works No.	Order No.	Year	Name	Sudan Ry No.
5232	E791	1897	Dongola	26
5233	E791	1897	Debbeh	27
5234	E791	1897	Korti	28
5280	E795	1898	Berber	29
5281	E795	1898	Khartoum	30
5345	E801	1898	Kassala	31
5346	E801	1898	Atbara	32
5347	E801	1898	Sennar	33

These locomotives were equipped with gates across the open ends of their cabs and pipes under the running board on the right side, which terminated in hose connections below the front buffer beam, so that water tenders could be coupled to the front and they could be run cab forward. The reason was that they were used on a single line which was still being constructed into the desert from Wadi Halfa and which initially had no water supply at the far end.

For some reason, these locomotives were not popular in the Sudan and they were all withdrawn from service by 1914.

== Illustration ==
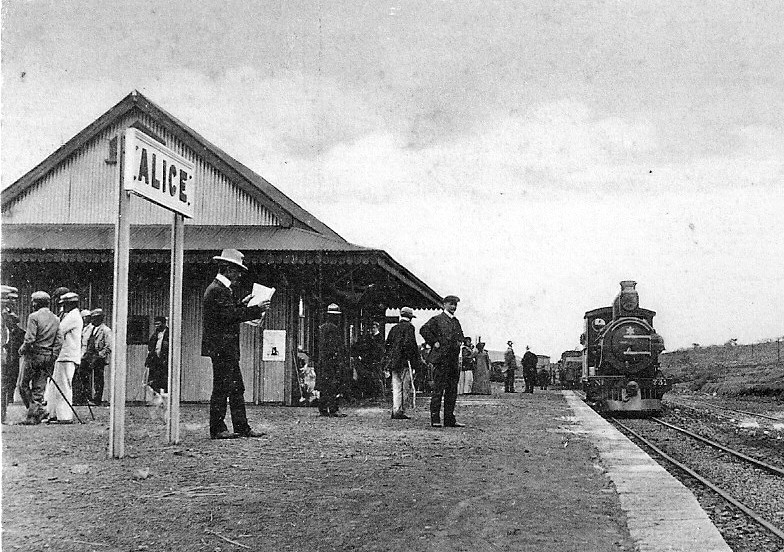
Eastern System 7th Class no. 731, later SAR Class 7A no. 1019, at Alice Station, Cape of Good Hope, c. 1900

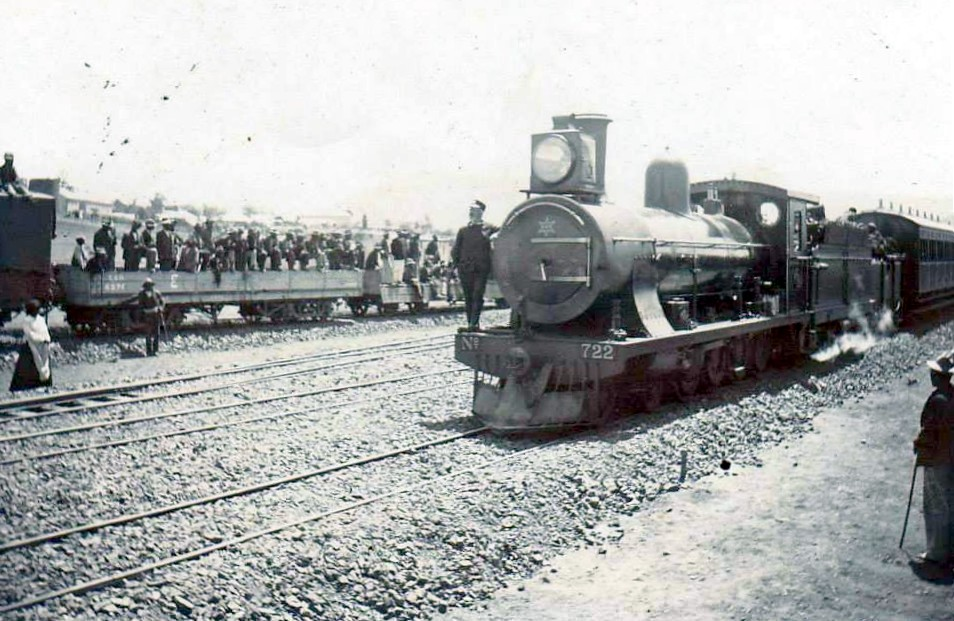
The Governor's train arrives in Fort Beaufort behind 7th Class no. 722, for the opening of the railway station in 1904

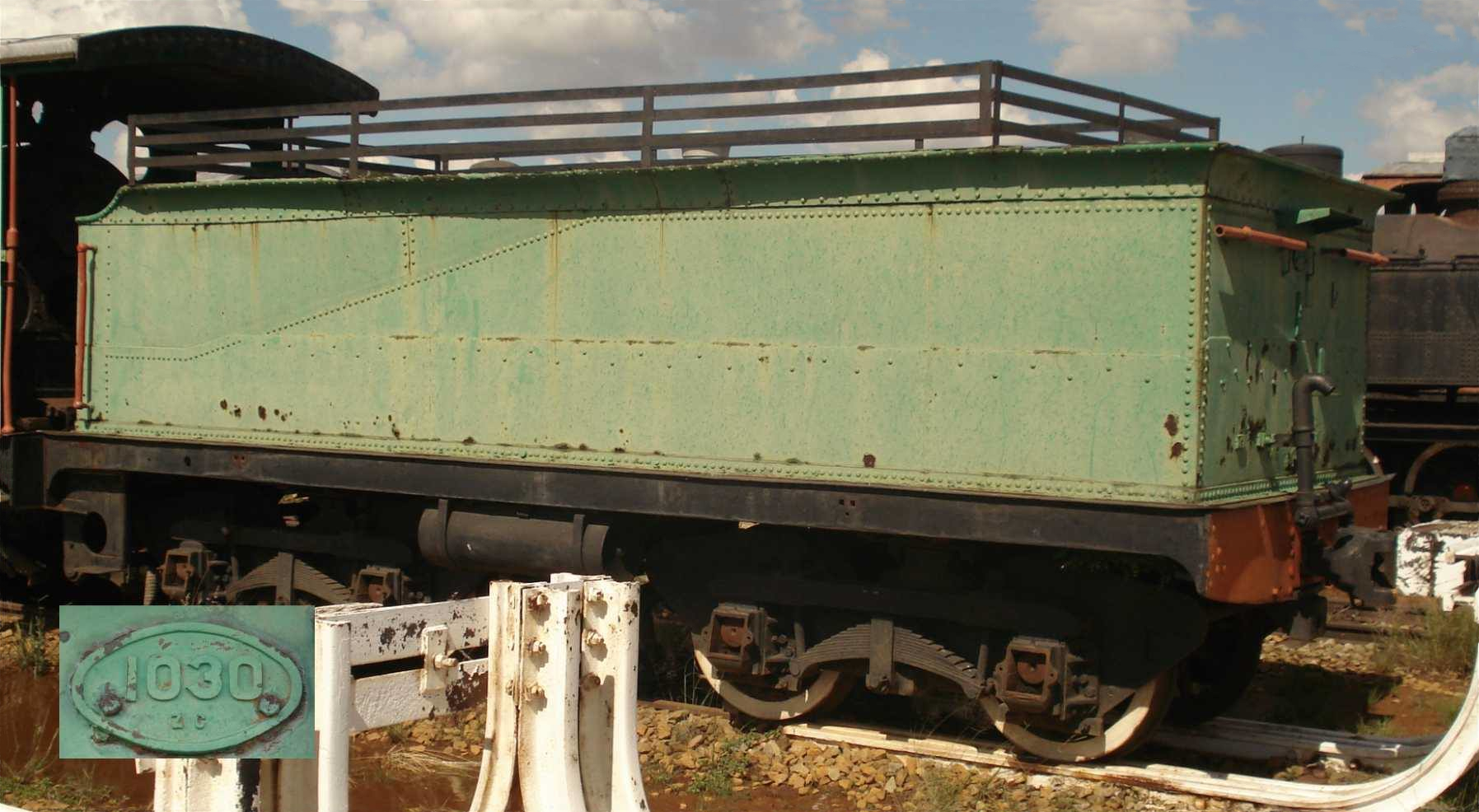
Type ZC tender as built, ex CGR no. 744 (Imvani-Indwe Railway's Gardner Williams), SAR no. 1030, c. 2000

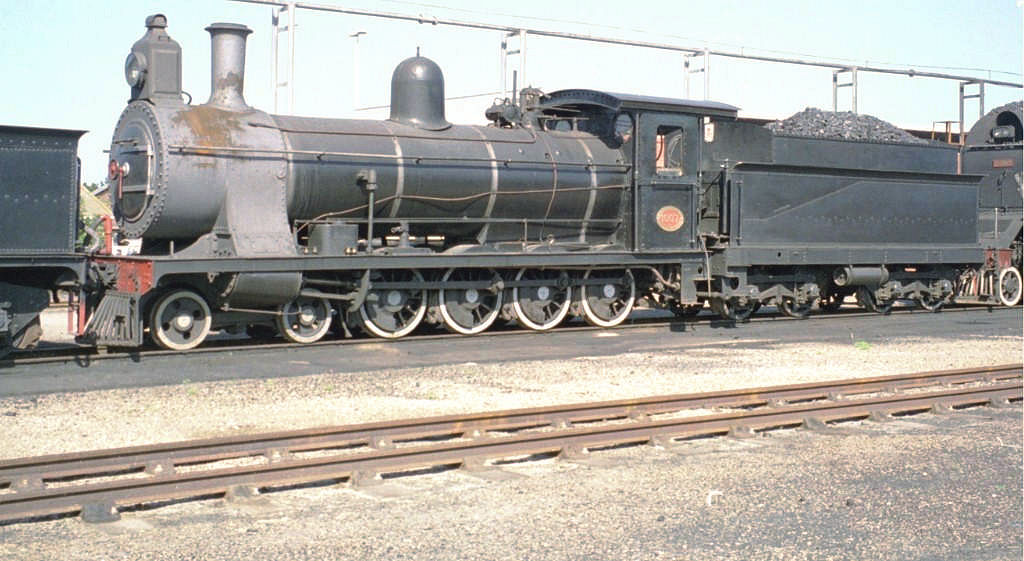
Ex CGR no. 724, SAR no. 1007, with modified Type ZC tender, Voorbaai, 4 September 1997
