= South African Class 7C 4-8-0 =

1902 design of steam locomotive

CGR 7th Class 4-8-0 1902 South African Classes 7C & 7CS 4-8-0
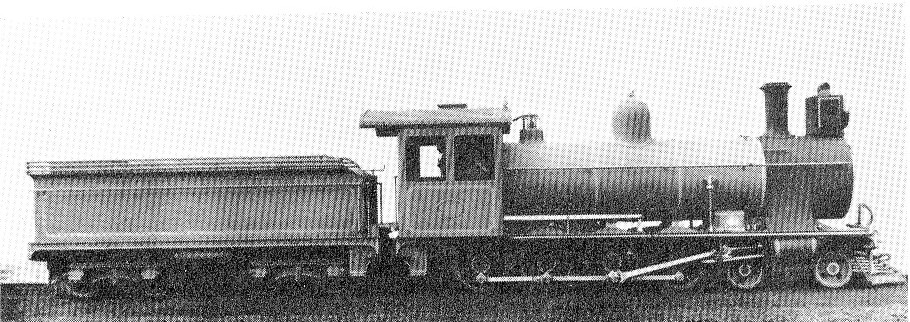
- CGR 7th Class no. 765, SAR Class 7C no. 1065
Type and origin
- ♠ Original locomotive, as built ♥ Locomotive equipped with superheating
- Power type: Steam
- Designer: Cape Government Railways (H.M. Beatty)
- Builder: Neilson, Reid and Company
- Serial number: 6079–6088
- Model: CGR 7th Class
- Build date: 1901
- Total produced: 10
Specifications
- Configuration
  - Whyte: 4-8-0 (Mastodon)
  - UIC: ♠ 2'Dn2 – ♥ 2'Dh2
- Driver: 2nd coupled axle
- Gauge: 3 ft 6 in (1,067 mm) Cape gauge
- Leading dia.: 28 1/2 in (724 mm)
- Coupled dia.: 42 3/4 in (1,086 mm)
- Tender wheels: 33 1/2 in (851 mm) as built 34 in (864 mm) retyred
- Wheelbase: 46 ft 2 in (14,072 mm)
  - Engine: 21 ft 3 1/2 in (6,490 mm)
  - Leading: 5 ft 3 in (1,600 mm)
  - Coupled: 12 ft (3,658 mm)
  - Tender: 16 ft 1 in (4,902 mm)
  - Tender bogie: 4 ft 7 in (1,397 mm)
- Length
  - Over couplers: 53 ft 4 1/2 in (16,269 mm)
- Height: ♠♥ 12 ft 10 in (3,912 mm)
- Frame type: Plate
- Axle load: ♠♥ 9 LT 14 cwt (9,856 kg)
  - Leading: ♠♥ 11 LT 2 cwt (11,280 kg)
  - 1st coupled: ♠♥ 9 LT 8 cwt (9,551 kg)
  - 2nd coupled: ♠♥ 9 LT 14 cwt (9,856 kg)
  - 3rd coupled: ♠♥ 9 LT 10 cwt (9,652 kg)
  - 4th coupled: ♠♥ 9 LT 8 cwt (9,551 kg)
  - Tender axle: 8 LT 10 cwt 2 qtr (8,662 kg) av.
- Adhesive weight: ♠♥ 38 LT (38,610 kg)
- Loco weight: ♠♥ 49 LT 2 cwt (49,890 kg)
- Tender weight: 34 LT 2 cwt (34,650 kg)
- Total weight: ♠♥ 83 LT 4 cwt (84,540 kg)
- Tender type: ZC (2-axle bogies); ZA, ZB, ZC, ZE permitted
- Fuel type: Coal
- Fuel capacity: 5 LT 10 cwt (5.6 t)
- Water cap.: 2,600 imp gal (11,800 L)
- Firebox
  - Type: Round-top
  - Grate area: ♠ 17.5 sq ft (1.63 m^{2}) ♥ 18 sq ft (1.7 m^{2})
- Boiler
  - Pitch: ♠♥ 6 ft 10 in (2,083 mm)
  - Diameter: ♠♥ 4 ft 6 in (1,372 mm)
  - Tube plates: ♠♥ 10 ft 9 in (3,277 mm)
  - Small tubes: ♠ 185: 1 7/8 in (48 mm) ♥ 100: 1 7/8 in (48 mm)
  - Large tubes: ♥ 18: 5 1/2 in (140 mm)
- Boiler pressure: 180 psi (1,241 kPa)
- Safety valve: Ramsbottom
- Heating surface
  - Firebox: ♠♥ 113 sq ft (10.5 m^{2})
  - Tubes: ♠ 976 sq ft (90.7 m^{2}) ♥ 806 sq ft (74.9 m^{2})
  - Total surface: ♠ 1,089 sq ft (101.2 m^{2}) ♥ 919 sq ft (85.4 m^{2})
- Superheater
  - Heating area: ♥ 206 sq ft (19.1 m^{2})
- Cylinders: Two
- Cylinder size: 17 1/2 in (444 mm) bore 23 in (584 mm) stroke
- Valve gear: Stephenson
- Valve type: ♠ Slide – ♥ Piston
- Couplers: Johnston link-and-pin AAR knuckle (1930s)
Performance figures
- Tractive effort: ♠ 22,240 lbf (98.9 kN) @ 75% ♥ 20,990 lbf (93.4 kN) @ 75%
- Factor of adh.: 3.83
Career
- Operators: Cape Government Railways; South African Railways
- Class: CGR 7th Class; SAR Class 7C, Class 7CS
- Number in class: 10
- Numbers: CGR 759-768; SAR 1059-1068
- Delivered: 1902
- First run: 1902
- Withdrawn: 1972
- The leading coupled axle had flangeless wheels

The South African Railways Class 7C 4-8-0 of 1902 was a steam locomotive from the pre-Union era in the Cape of Good Hope.

In 1902, the Cape Government Railways placed its last ten 7th Class 4-8-0 Mastodon type steam locomotives in service on the Cape Eastern System. In 1912, when all these locomotives were assimilated into the South African Railways, they were renumbered and designated Class 7C.

== Manufacturer ==
The last of the 7th Class locomotives to be ordered by the Cape Government Railways (CGR), were ten for the Cape Eastern System. They were built by Neilson, Reid and Company in 1901 and delivered and placed in service in 1902, with engine numbers in the range from 759 to 768.

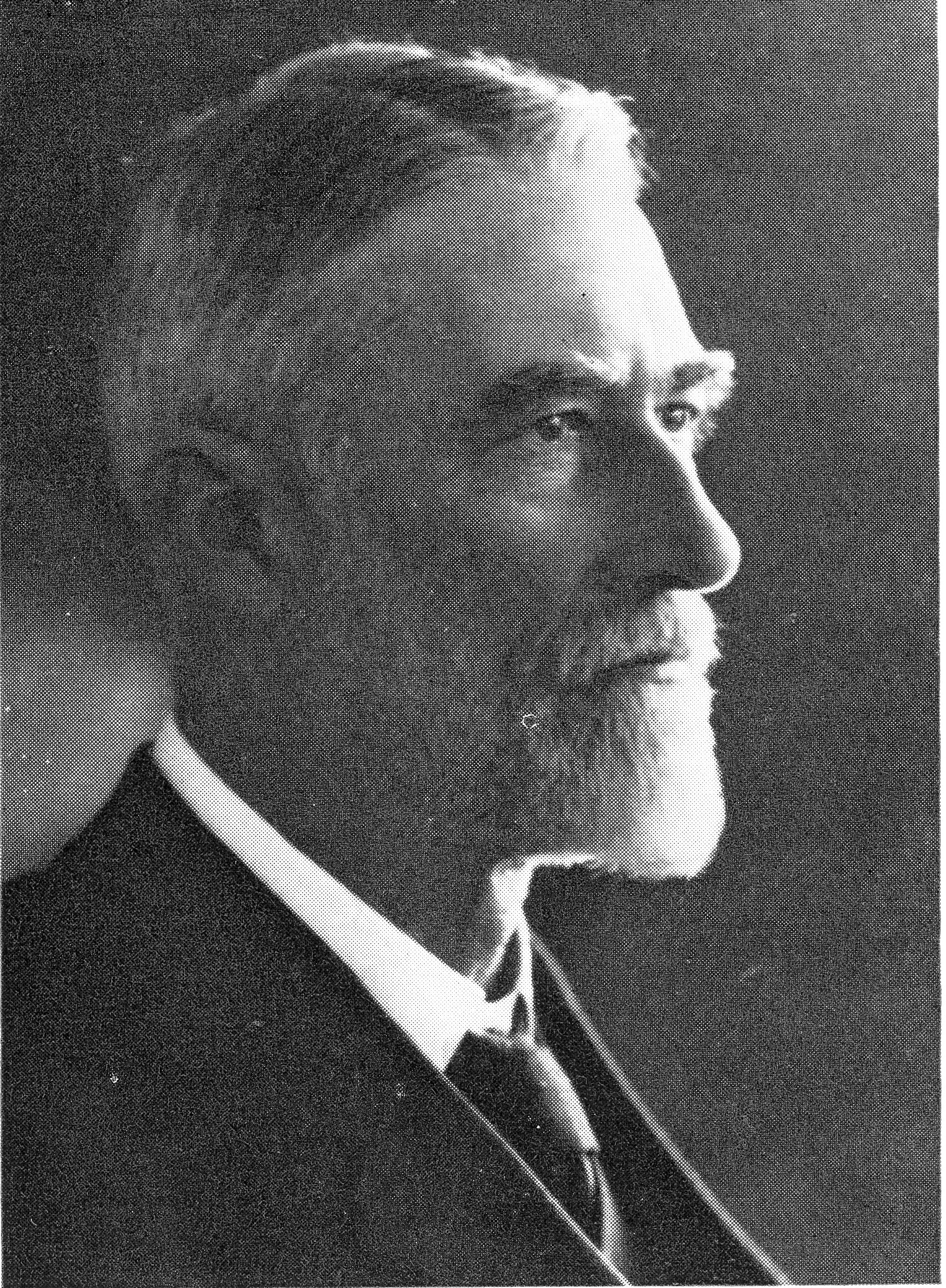
H.M. Beatty

The original Cape 7th Class locomotive had been designed in 1892 by H.M. Beatty, at the time the Cape Government Railways (Western System) Locomotive Superintendent.

This last batch of locomotives differed from all previous 7th Class models in having a large commodious cab with double windows on each side, similar to those which were fitted to the ex Central South African Railways (CSAR) Class 7B locomotives. This afforded better protection for the crew. They were more than 4 long tons (4.1 tonnes) heavier than the original 7th Class locomotives, with larger diameter boilers with a higher boiler pressure. Their power was further improved by their increased cylinder diameter.

== Class 7 sub-classes ==
When the Union of South Africa was established on 31 May 1910, the three Colonial government railways (CGR, Natal Government Railways and Central South African Railways) were united under a single administration to control and administer the railways, ports and harbours of the Union. Although the South African Railways and Harbours came into existence in 1910, the actual classification and renumbering of all the rolling stock of the three constituent railways were only implemented with effect from 1 January 1912.

When these locomotives were assimilated into the South African Railways (SAR) in 1912, they were renumbered in the range from 1059 to 1068 and designated Class 7C.

Other Class 7 locomotives which came onto the SAR roster from the CGR and other Colonial railways in the region, namely the CSAR, the Natal Government Railways (NGR), some from the Rhodesia Railways (RR) and, in 1925, from the New Cape Central Railways (NCCR), were grouped into another six sub-classes by the SAR, becoming SAR Classes 7, 7A, 7B and 7D to 7F.

== Modifications ==
During the 1930s, many of the Class 7 series locomotives were equipped with superheated boilers and piston valves. On the Classes 7B and 7C, this conversion was sometimes indicated with an "S" suffix to the class number on the locomotive number plates, but on the rest of the Class 7 family this distinction was not applied consistently. The superheated versions could be identified by the position of the chimney on the smokebox. The chimney was displaced forward on the superheated engines to provide space behind it in the smokebox for the superheater header.

== Service ==
=== South Africa ===
In SAR service, the Class 7 series worked on every system in the country. They remained in branch line service until they were finally withdrawn in 1972.

=== South West Africa ===
In 1915, shortly after the outbreak of the First World War, the German South West Africa colony was occupied by the Union Defence Forces. Since a large part of the territory's railway infrastructure and rolling stock was destroyed or damaged by retreating German forces, an urgent need arose for locomotives for use on the Cape gauge lines in that territory. In 1917, numbers 1065 to 1067 were transferred to the Defence Department for service in South West Africa.

These three locomotives remained in South West Africa after the war. They proved to be so successful in that territory that more were gradually transferred there in later years. By the time the Class 24 locomotives arrived in SWA in 1949, 53 locomotives of the Class 7 family were still in use there. Most remained there and were only transferred back to South Africa when the Class 32-000 diesel-electric locomotives replaced them in 1961.

== Preservation ==
Only one of these locomotives has survived into preservation. Locomotive no. 1062 has been preserved at Prieska Station Forecourt.
