= South African type ZA tender =

Steam locomotive introduced in 1892

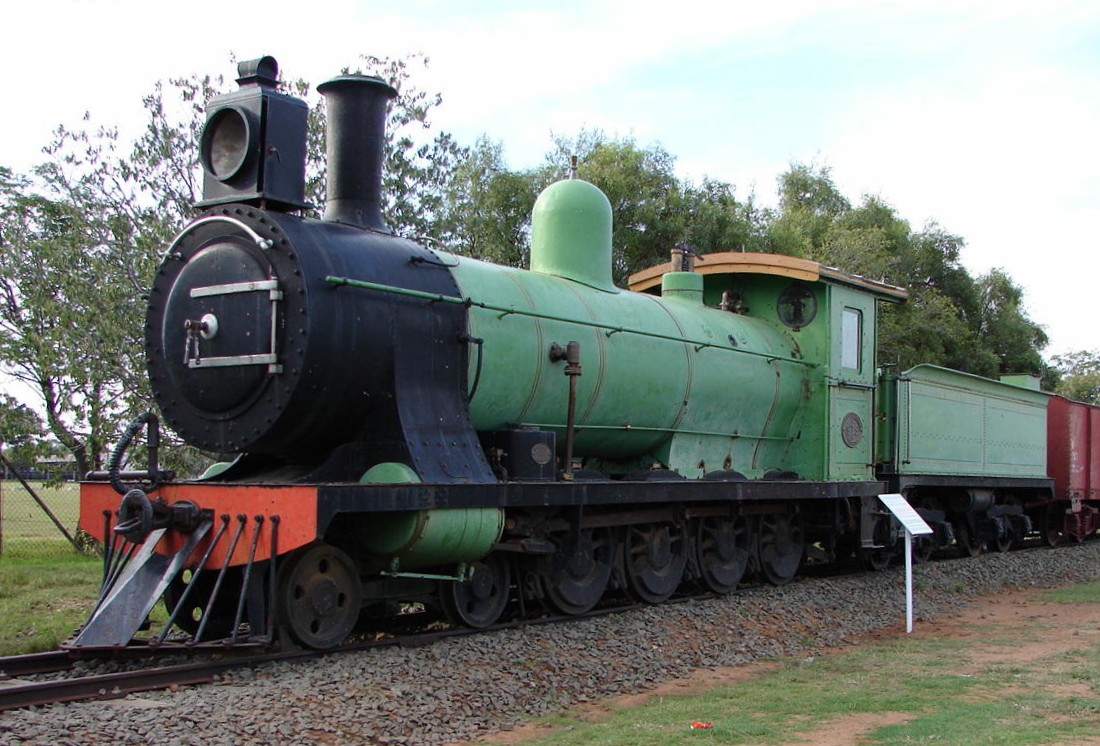
- Type ZA tender on CGR 7th Class of 1892
Type and origin
- Locomotive: CGR 7th Class of 1892
- Designer: Cape Government Railways (H.M. Beatty)
- Builder: Dübs and Company
- In service: 1892
Specifications
- Configuration: 2-axle bogies
- Gauge: 3 ft 6 in (1,067 mm) Cape gauge
- Length: 21 ft 9 1/8 in (6,633 mm)
- Wheel dia.: 33 1/2 in (851 mm) as built 34 in (864 mm) retyred
- Wheelbase: 14 ft 7 in (4,445 mm)
  - Bogie: 4 ft 7 in (1,397 mm)
- Fuel type: Coal
- Fuel cap.: 3 LT 10 cwt (3.6 t)
- Water cap.: 2,220 imp gal (10,100 L)
- Stoking: Manual
- Couplers: Drawbar & Johnston link-and-pin
Career
- Operators: Cape Government Railways; Imperial Military Railways; South African Railways
- Numbers: SAR 950-953, 968-969

The South African type ZA tender was a steam locomotive tender from the pre-Union era in the Cape of Good Hope.

The Type ZA tender entered service in 1892, as tenders to the first batch of 7th Class 4-8-0 Mastodon type steam locomotives to be acquired by the Cape Government Railways. These locomotives were designated Class 7 on the South African Railways in 1912.

== Manufacturer ==
The Types ZA and ZB tenders were both introduced in 1892 as tenders to the original Cape Government Railways (CGR) 7th Class 4-8-0 Mastodon type locomotive, which was built in two batches. Six engines were built by Dübs and Company in 1892, and 32 by Neilson and Company in 1892 and 1893. Since a Neilson works picture shows one of the Neilson-built batch of locomotives with the larger-capacity three-axle Type ZB tender, it is likely that the smaller-capacity Type ZA bogie tenders were delivered with the first batch of six 7th Class locomotives, built by Dübs.

The locomotive and tender were designed at the Salt River works in Cape Town under the supervision of Western System Locomotive Superintendent H.M. Beatty.

The Type ZA entered service as tenders to these locomotives, all of which were initially placed in service on the Midland System of the CGR, but were later distributed between the Midland and Eastern Systems. These engines would be designated Class 7 on the South African Railways (SAR) in 1912.

== Characteristics ==
The tender had a coal capacity of 3 long tons 10 hundredweight (3.6 tonnes) and a water capacity of 2,220 imperial gallons (10,100 litres).

== Locomotive ==
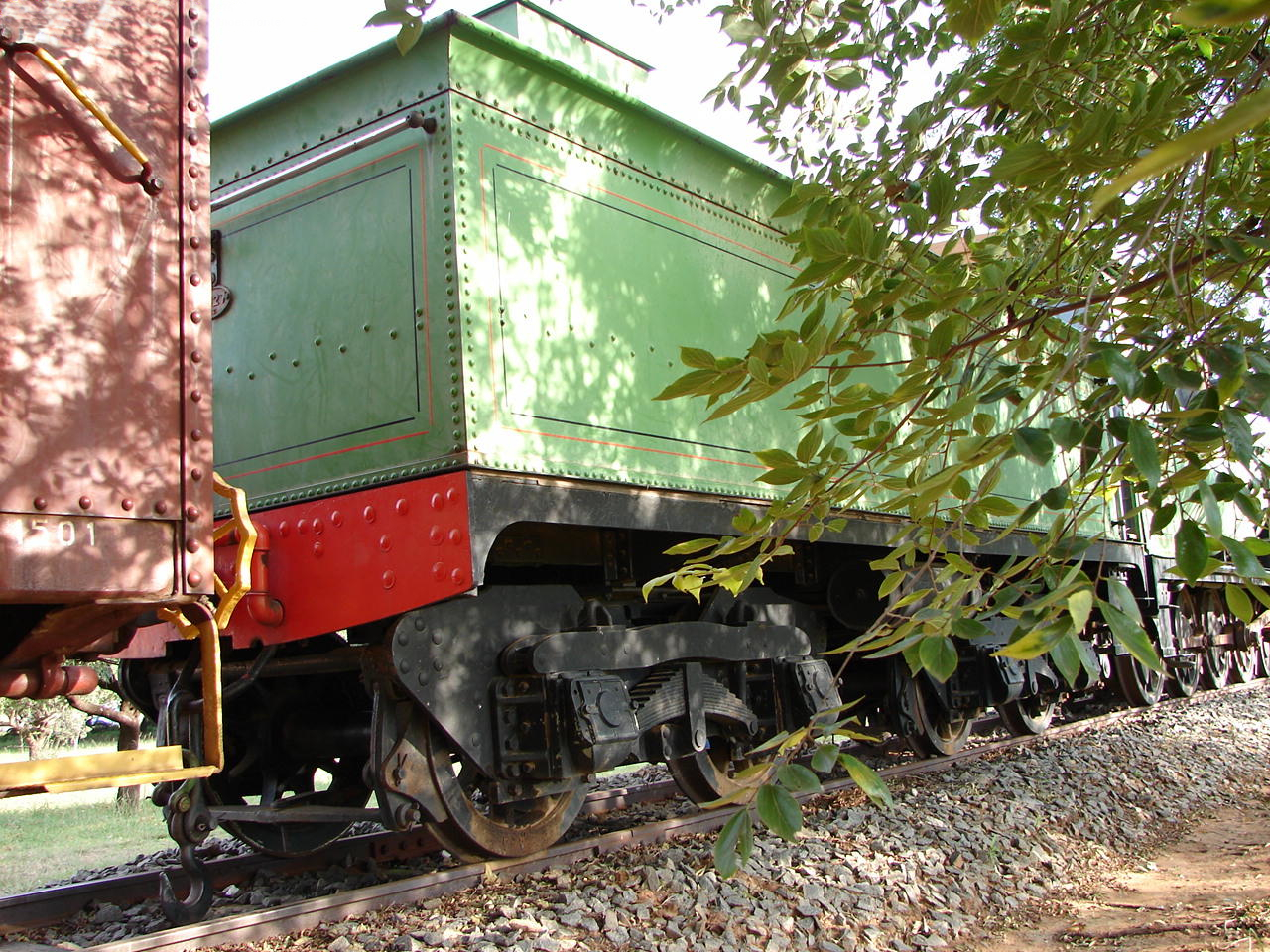
Type ZA tender

In the SAR years, tenders were numbered for the engines they were delivered with. In most cases, an oval number plate, bearing the tender number and tender type, would be attached to the rear end of the tender. During the classification and renumbering of locomotives onto the SAR roster in 1912, no separate classification and renumbering list was published for tenders, which should have been renumbered according to the locomotive renumbering list.

Only Class 7 locomotives were delivered new with Type ZA tenders. The six Dübs-built tenders should have been renumbered in the SAR number range from 950 to 953 in respect of the four ex-Midland System engines, and 968 and 969 in respect of the two ex-Eastern System engines. Having already been in service for twenty years by then and given the interchangeability of tenders between engines, it is possible, but not confirmed, that tenders were numbered for the engines they were attached to at the time.

== Classification letters ==
Since many tender types are interchangeable between different locomotive classes and types, a tender classification system was adopted by the SAR. The first letter of the tender type indicates the classes of engines to which it could be coupled. The "Z_" tenders could be used with the following locomotive classes:

- CGR 7th Class of 1892, SAR Class 7.
- CGR 7th Class of 1896, SAR Class 7A.
- Imperial Military Railways 7th Class, SAR Class 7B.
- CGR 7th Class of 1902, SAR Class 7C.
- Rhodesia Railways 7th Class, SAR Class 7D.
- New Cape Central Railways 7th Class of 1899, SAR Class 7E.
- New Cape Central Railways 7th Class of 1913, SAR Class 7F.

The second letter indicates the tender's water capacity. The "_A" tenders had a capacity of 2,220 imperial gallons (10,100 litres; 2,670 US gallons).
