= South African type ZB tender =

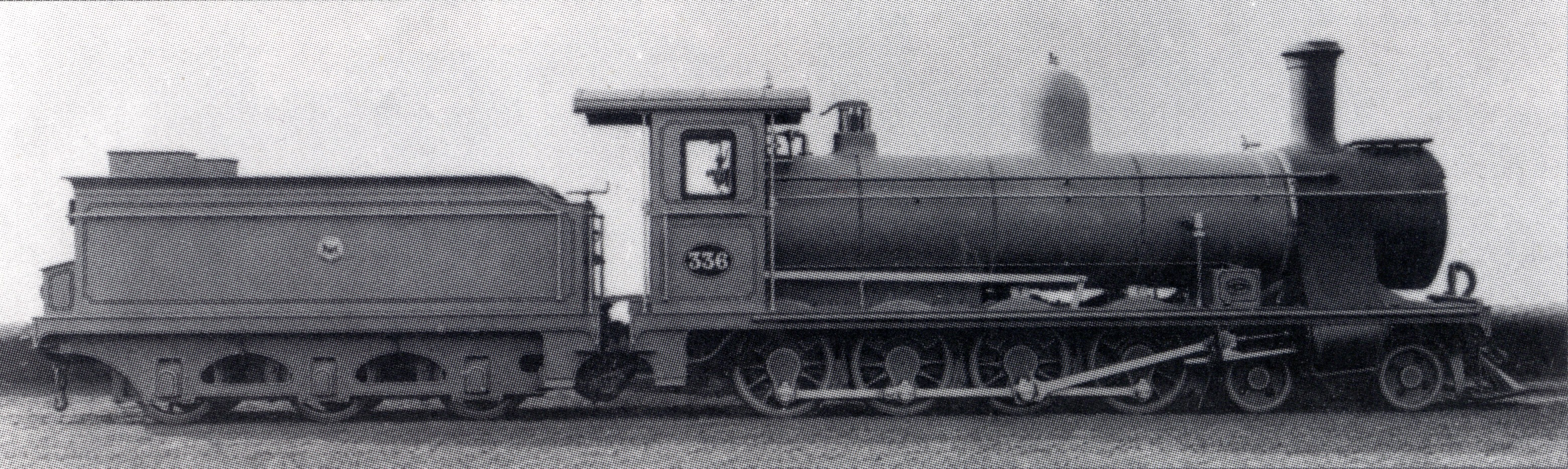
- Type ZB tender on CGR 7th Class of 1892
Type and origin
- Locomotive: CGR 7th Class of 1892
- Designer: Cape Government Railways (H.M. Beatty)
- Builder: Neilson and Company
- In service: 1892-1893
Specifications
- Configuration: 3-axle
- Gauge: 3 ft 6 in (1,067 mm) Cape gauge
- Length: 20 ft 3 1/8 in (6,175 mm)
- Wheel dia.: 37 in (940 mm)
- Wheelbase: 10 ft (3,048 mm)
- Axle load: 9 LT 13 cwt 3 qtr (9,843 kg) av.
- Weight empty: 31,560 lb (14,320 kg)
- Weight w/o: 29 LT 1 cwt (29,520 kg)
- Fuel type: Coal
- Fuel cap.: 5 LT (5.1 t)
- Water cap.: 2,370 imp gal (10,800 L)
- Stoking: Manual
- Couplers: Drawbar & Johnston link-and-pin
Career
- Operators: Cape Government Railways; Imperial Military Railways; South African Railways
- Numbers: SAR 954-967, 970-987

The South African type ZB tender was a steam locomotive tender from the pre-Union era in the Cape of Good Hope.

The Type ZB tender entered service in 1892, as tenders to the second batch of 7th Class 4-8-0 Mastodon type steam locomotives to be acquired by the Cape Government Railways. These locomotives were designated Class 7 on the South African Railways in 1912.

== Manufacturer ==
The Types ZA and ZB tenders were both introduced in 1892 as tenders to the original Cape Government Railways (CGR) 7th Class 4-8-0 Mastodon type locomotive, which was built in two batches. Six engines were built by Dübs and Company in 1892, and 32 by Neilson and Company in 1892 and 1893. Since a Neilson works picture shows one of the Neilson-built batch of locomotives with a three-axle tender, it is likely that the larger-capacity Type ZB three-axle tenders were delivered with the second batch of 32 7th Class locomotives, built by Neilson.

The locomotive and tender were designed at the Salt River works in Cape Town in 1892, under the supervision of H.M. Beatty, the CGR Western System's Locomotive Superintendent.

The Type ZB entered service as tenders to these locomotives, all of which were initially placed in service on the Midland System of the CGR, but were later distributed between the Midland and Eastern Systems. These engines would be designated Class 7 on the South African Railways (SAR) in 1912.

== Characteristics ==
The tender had a coal capacity of 5 long tons (5.1 tonnes) and a water capacity of 2,370 imperial gallons (10,800 litres), with an average maximum axle load of 9 long tons 13 hundredweight 3 quarters (9,843 kilograms).

== Locomotive ==
In the SAR years, tenders were numbered for the engines they were delivered with. In most cases, an oval number plate, bearing the engine number and often also the locomotive class or tender type, would be attached to the rear end of the tender. During the classification and renumbering of locomotives onto the SAR roster in 1912, no separate classification and renumbering list was published for tenders, which should have been renumbered according to the locomotive renumbering list.

Only Class 7 locomotives were delivered new with Type ZB tenders. The 32 Neilson-built tenders should have been numbered in the SAR number ranges from 954 to 967 and 975 to 977 in respect of the seventeen ex-Midland System engines, and 970 to 974 and 978 to 987 in respect of the fifteen ex-Eastern System engines. Having already been in service for twenty years by then and given the interchangeability of tenders between engines, it is possible, but not confirmed, that tenders were numbered for the engines they were attached to at the time.

== Classification letters ==
Since many tender types are interchangeable between different locomotive classes and types, a tender classification system was adopted by the SAR. The first letter of the tender type indicates the classes of engines to which it could be coupled. The "Z_" tenders could be used with the following locomotive classes:

- CGR 7th Class of 1892, SAR Class 7.
- CGR 7th Class of 1896, SAR Class 7A.
- Imperial Military Railways 7th Class, SAR Class 7B.
- CGR 7th Class of 1902, SAR Class 7C.
- Rhodesia Railways 7th Class, SAR Class 7D.
- New Cape Central Railways 7th Class of 1899, SAR Class 7E.
- New Cape Central Railways 7th Class of 1913, SAR Class 7F.

The second letter indicates the tender's water capacity. The "_B" tenders had a capacity of 2,370 imperial gallons (10,800 litres; 2,850 US gallons).
