= South African Class 7 4-8-0 =

1892 design of steam locomotive

CGR 7th Class 4-8-0 1892 South African Class 7 4-8-0
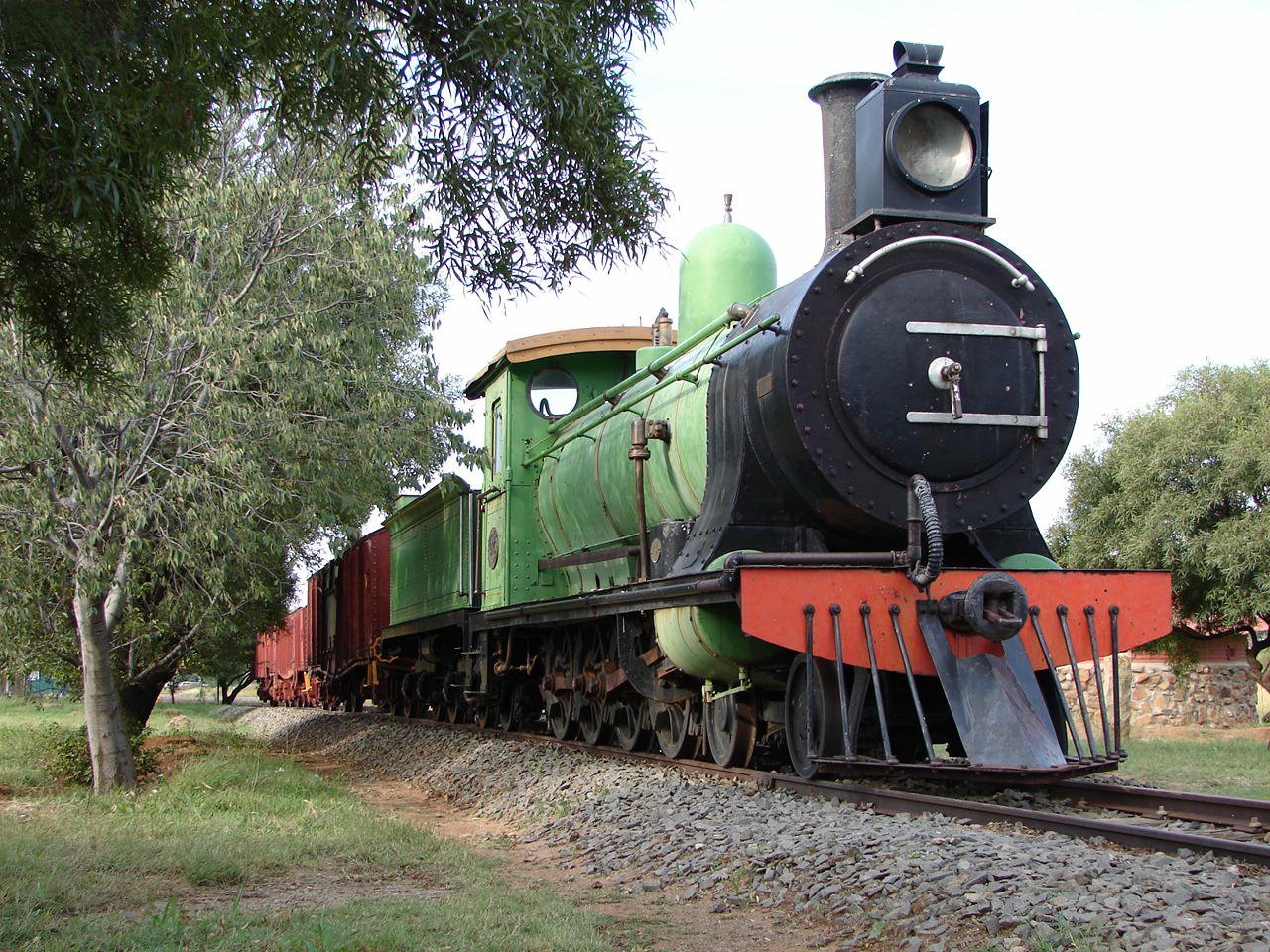
- Midland System no. 344, SAR no. 975, with type ZA tender, Bloemfontein, 6 April 2006
Type and origin
- ♠ Type ZA tender (2-axle bogies, Dübs) ♥ Type ZB tender (3-axle, Neilson) ♣ Original locomotive, as built ♦ Locomotive equipped with superheating
- Power type: Steam
- Designer: Cape Government Railways (H.M. Beatty)
- Builder: Dübs and Company; Neilson and Company
- Serial number: Dübs 2882-2887; Neilson 4446-4477
- Model: CGR 7th
- Build date: 1892
- Total produced: 38
Specifications
- Configuration
  - Whyte: 4-8-0 (Mastodon)
  - UIC: 2'Dn2
- Driver: 2nd coupled axle
- Gauge: 3 ft 6 in (1,067 mm) Cape gauge
- Leading dia.: 28 1/2 in (724 mm)
- Coupled dia.: 42 3/4 in (1,086 mm)
- Tender wheels: ♠ 33 1/2 in (851 mm) as built ♠ 34 in (864 mm) retyred ♥ 37 in (940 mm)
- Wheelbase: ♠ 41 ft 4 3/8 in (12,608 mm) ♥ 46 ft 2 in (14,072 mm)
  - Engine: 21 ft 3 1/2 in (6,490 mm)
  - Leading: 5 ft 3 in (1,600 mm)
  - Coupled: 12 ft (3,658 mm)
  - Tender: ♠ 14 ft 7 in (4,445 mm) ♥ 10 ft (3,048 mm)
  - Tender bogie: ♠ 4 ft 7 in (1,397 mm)
- Length
  - Over couplers: ♠ 51 ft 7 in (15,723 mm) ♥ 50 ft 1 in (15,265 mm)
- Height: ♣ 12 ft 4 1/2 in (3,772 mm) ♦ 12 ft 10 in (3,912 mm)
- Frame type: Plate
- Axle load: ♣ 9 LT (9,144 kg) ♦ 9 LT 14 cwt (9,856 kg)
  - Leading: ♣ 10 LT 9 cwt (10,620 kg) ♦ 11 LT 2 cwt (11,280 kg)
  - 1st coupled: ♣ 8 LT 14 cwt (8,840 kg) ♦ 9 LT 8 cwt (9,551 kg)
  - 2nd coupled: ♣ 8 LT 11 cwt (8,687 kg) ♦ 9 LT 14 cwt (9,856 kg)
  - 3rd coupled: ♣ 9 LT (9,144 kg) ♦ 9 LT 10 cwt (9,652 kg)
  - 4th coupled: ♣ 8 LT 16 cwt (8,941 kg) ♦ 9 LT 8 cwt (9,551 kg)
  - Tender axle: ♥ 9 LT 13 cwt 3 qtr (9,843 kg) av.
- Adhesive weight: ♣ 35 LT 1 cwt (35,610 kg) ♦ 38 LT (38,610 kg)
- Loco weight: ♣ 45 LT 10 cwt (46,230 kg) ♦ 49 LT 2 cwt (49,890 kg)
- Tender weight: ♥ 29 LT 1 cwt (29,520 kg)
- Total weight: ♥♣ 74 LT 11 cwt (75,750 kg) ♥♦ 78 LT 3 cwt (79,400 kg)
- Tender type: ZA (2-axle bogies) or ZB (3-axle); ZA, ZB, ZC, ZE permitted
- Fuel type: Coal
- Fuel capacity: ♠ 3 LT 10 cwt (3.6 t) ♥ 5 LT (5.1 t)
- Water cap.: ♠ 2,220 imp gal (10,100 L) ♥ 2,370 imp gal (10,800 L)
- Firebox
  - Type: Round-top
  - Grate area: ♣ 17.5 sq ft (1.63 m^{2}) ♦ 18 sq ft (1.7 m^{2})
- Boiler
  - Pitch: ♣ 6 ft 6 in (1,981 mm) ♦ 6 ft 10 in (2,083 mm)
  - Diameter: ♣ 4 ft 2 in (1,270 mm) ♦ 4 ft 6 in (1,372 mm)
  - Tube plates: ♣♦ 10 ft 9 in (3,277 mm)
  - Small tubes: ♣ 185: 1 3/4 in (44 mm) ♦ 100: 1 7/8 in (48 mm)
  - Large tubes: ♦ 18: 5 1/2 in (140 mm)
- Boiler pressure: ♣ 160 psi (1,103 kPa) as built ♣ 170 psi (1,172 kPa) adjusted ♦ 180 psi (1,241 kPa)
- Safety valve: Ramsbottom
- Heating surface
  - Firebox: ♣ 99 sq ft (9.2 m^{2}) ♦ 113 sq ft (10.5 m^{2})
  - Tubes: ♣ 911 sq ft (84.6 m^{2}) ♦ 806 sq ft (74.9 m^{2})
  - Total surface: ♣ 1,010 sq ft (94 m^{2}) ♦ 919 sq ft (85.4 m^{2})
- Superheater
  - Heating area: ♦ 206 sq ft (19.1 m^{2})
- Cylinders: Two
- Cylinder size: 17 in (432 mm) bore 23 in (584 mm) stroke
- Valve gear: Stephenson
- Couplers: Johnston link-and-pin
Performance figures
- Tractive effort: ♣ 18,660 lbf (83.0 kN) @ 75% ♣ 19,810 lbf (88.1 kN) @ 75% adjusted ♦ 22,240 lbf (98.9 kN) @ 75%
- Factor of adh.: 4.20
Career
- Operators: Cape Government Railways; Imperial Military Railways; South African Railways; Zambesi Saw Mills
- Class: Class 7
- Number in class: 38
- Numbers: CGR 315-352; 17 renumbered 701-717; IMR C520, C521 & C524; SAR 950-987
- Delivered: 1892–1893
- First run: 1892
- Withdrawn: 1972
- The leading coupled axle had flangeless wheels

The South African Railways Class 7 4-8-0 of 1892 is a steam locomotive from the pre-Union era in the Cape of Good Hope.

In 1892, the Cape Government Railways placed six 7th Class steam locomotives with a 4-8-0 Mastodon type wheel arrangement in service and, until 1893, another 32 were acquired. They were initially placed in service on the Midland System, but were later distributed between the Midland and Eastern Systems. The locomotives were renumbered in 1912, when they were assimilated into the South African Railways, but retained their Class 7 classification.

== Manufacturers ==
In 1890, Michael Stephens, then Chief Locomotive Superintendent of the Cape Government Railways (CGR), accompanied General Manager C.B. Elliot on a visit to Durban, to examine and report on the new Dübs A 4-8-2T (later NGR Class D) tank locomotives which had been placed in service by the Natal Government Railways (NGR) in 1888. In Elliot's subsequent report, he stated his conviction that locomotives with eight-coupled wheels should be adopted for the coastal sections of the Midland and Eastern Systems, where fog and the damp atmosphere were detrimental to tractive adhesion at night in the summer months.

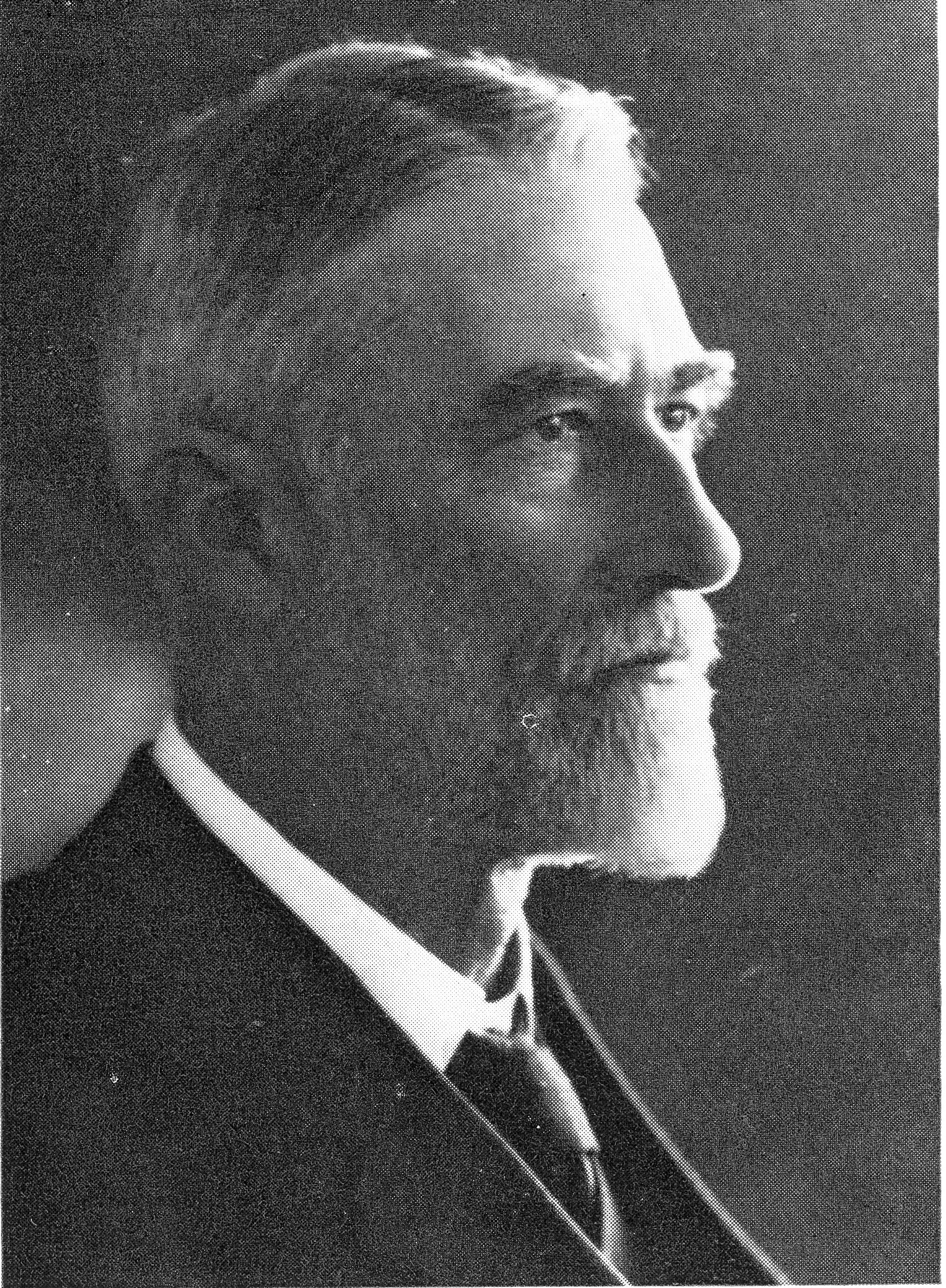
H.M. Beatty

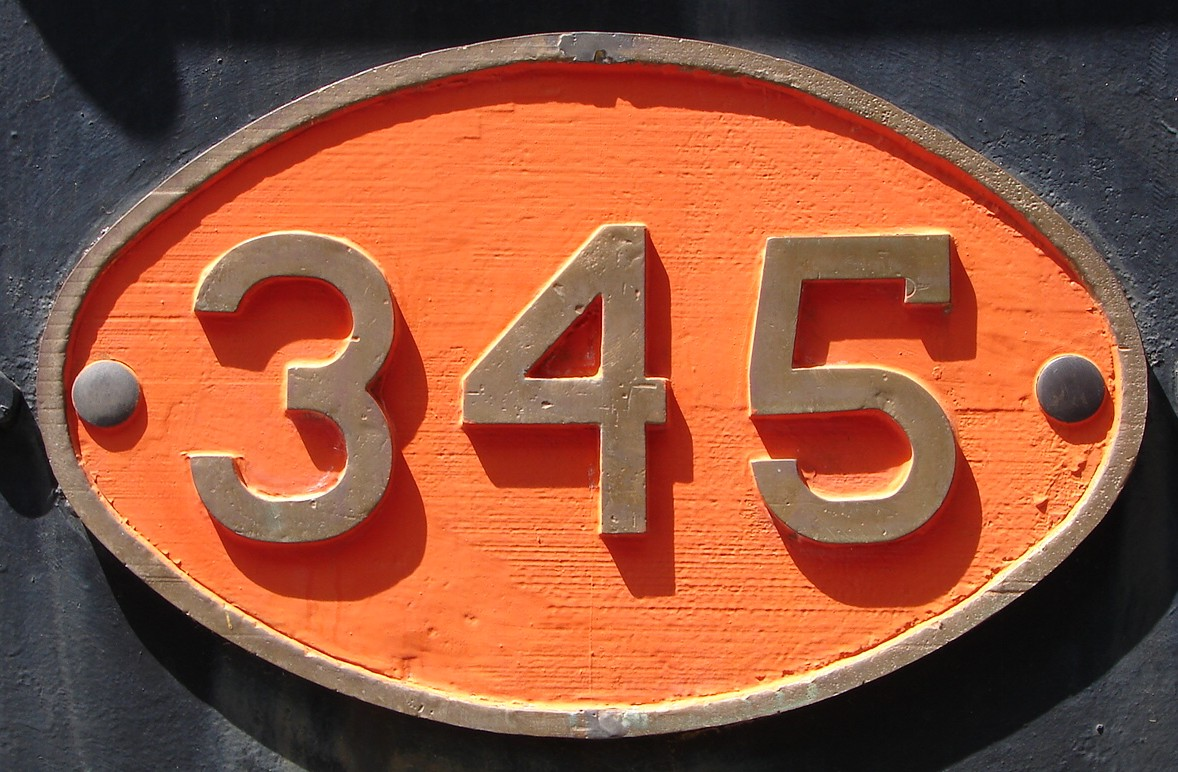
CGR Number plate

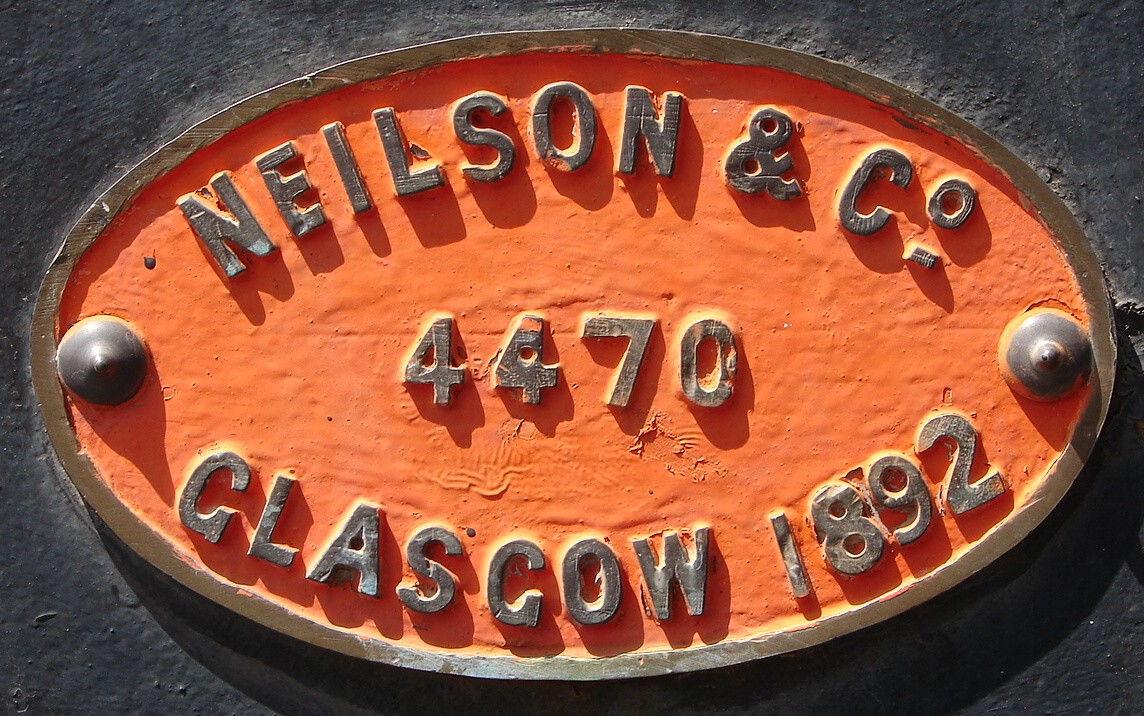
Works plate, no. 345

Following this report, a complete design for such a locomotive was prepared at the Salt River works, under the supervision of Western System Locomotive Superintendent H.M. Beatty. The last six of an order for 36 Cape 5th Class 4-6-0 locomotives from Dübs and Company were cancelled and substituted with an order for six of these new 7th Class locomotives. They were delivered in 1892, numbered in the range from 315 to 320 for the Midland System. Two of them, numbers 318 and 320, were later renumbered to 701 and 702 and re-allocated to the Eastern System.

These six locomotives were equipped with type ZA tenders which rode on two two-axle bogies, the first proper bogie tenders to enter service in South Africa. They had a capacity of 3 long tons 10 hundredweight (3.6 tonnes) coal and 2,220 imperial gallons (10,100 litres) water.

The first six locomotives were followed by an order for another 32 of these engines, which were delivered from Neilson and Company in 1892 and 1893. These engines were initially numbered in the range from 321 to 352 for the Midland System. Fifteen of them were later renumbered in the range from 703 to 717 and re-allocated to the Eastern System. They were equipped with type ZB tenders, which rode on three-axle bogies. They had a larger capacity of 5 long tons (5.1 tonnes) coal and 2,370 imperial gallons (10,800 litres) water, with an average maximum axle load of 9 long tons 13 hundredweight 3 quarters (9,843 kilograms).

While the Cape 6th Class, which was designed and ordered at the same time as the 7th Class, was conceived as a fast passenger locomotive, the 7th Class was conceived as its heavy goods locomotive counterpart. The 7th Class turned out to be a most useful and well liked locomotive type. It continued the attractive appearance of the Cape's locomotives, with a strong construction and sound design. Some remained in service for nearly eighty years.

== Characteristics ==
The 7th Class represented a considerable advance in design and power. They were the first South African locomotives to be equipped with sight feed lubricators which allowed a sight glass to be positioned in the cab, where the rate of oil feed to the cylinders could be observed. The reversing gear was of the quick-threaded screw type instead of the reversing lever which had earlier been used.

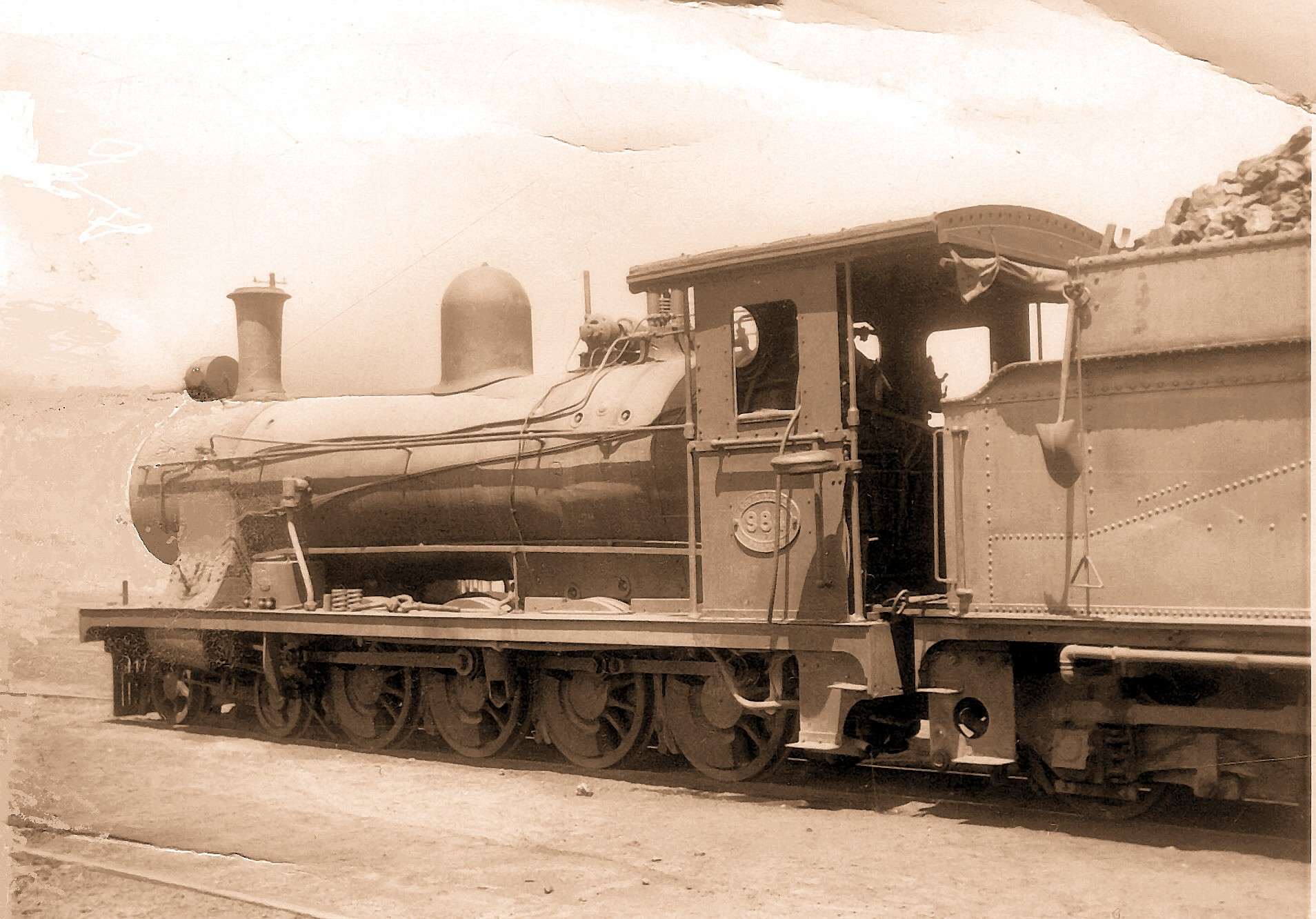
SAR no. 984 at Walvisbaai with the stoker's seat swung out, c. 1955

The seats of the driver and stoker were mounted on poles which allowed them to be swung around to outside the cab. This was popular amongst crews, who could often be seen riding outside the engine when working in the hotter areas of the country and in South West Africa.

In his report for 1892, Stephens compared the hauling power of the 7th Class to that of older locomotives working between Port Elizabeth and Cradock on the Midland System as 22 to 14. Their even distribution of weight and flexibility rendered them very easy on the permanent way, while the crews declared them to be the steadiest engines they had yet had on the System, in spite of their height. Stephens regarded the 7th Class as maximum-power goods-train engines, although he believed that the limit of power on Cape gauge had not yet been reached.

== Class 7 sub-classes ==
When the Union of South Africa was established on 31 May 1910, the three Colonial government railways (CGR, NGR and Central South African Railways) were united under a single administration to control and administer the railways, ports and harbours of the Union. Although the South African Railways and Harbours came into existence in 1910, the actual classification and renumbering of all the rolling stock of the three constituent railways was only implemented with effect from 1 January 1912.

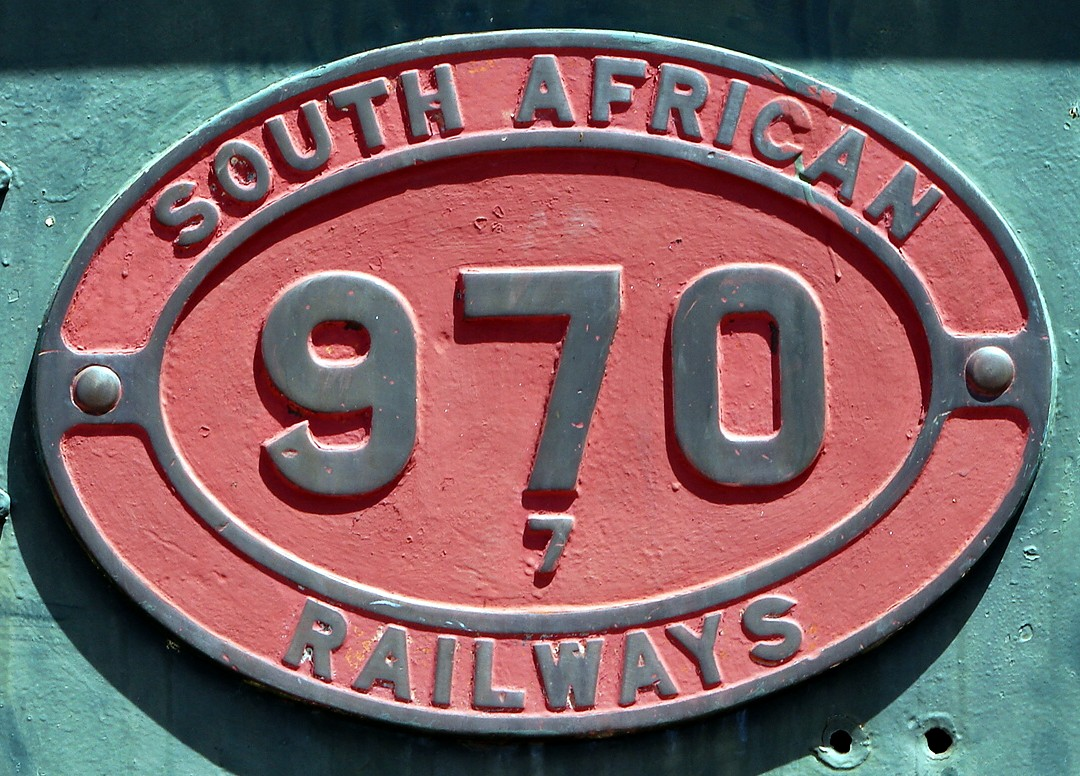

When these 38 locomotives were assimilated into the SAR in 1912, they were renumbered in the range from 950 to 987, but they retained their Class 7 designation.

The rest of the CGR's 7th Class locomotives, together with 7th Class locomotives from the Central South African Railways (CSAR), Pretoria-Pietersburg Railway (PPR), Rhodesia Railways (RR), the NGR and, in 1925, the New Cape Central Railways (NCCR), were grouped into six different sub-classes by the SAR and designated Classes 7A to 7F.

== Modifications ==
During the 1930s and later, many of the Class 7 series locomotives were equipped with superheated boilers and piston valves. On the Class 7B and Class 7C, this conversion was sometimes indicated with an "S" suffix to the class number on the locomotive's number plates, but on the rest of the Class 7 family this distinction was rarely applied.

The superheated versions could be visually identified by the position of the chimney on the smokebox, the chimney having been displaced forward to provide space behind it in the smokebox for the superheater header. They were equipped with larger type ZE tenders, which rode on two two-axle bogies and had a capacity of 8 long tons (8.1 tonnes) coal and 2,850 imperial gallons (13,000 litres) water.

== Service ==
=== South Africa ===
The 7th Class became the main goods locomotive during the last twenty years of the existence of the CGR. The Class has been described as the Class 15F of its generation. For thirty years they handled most trains between Port Elizabeth and Cradock and on many other SAR mainlines. Three of them also saw service with the Imperial Military Railways (IMR) during the Second Boer War from 1899 to 1902, having been allocated to the IMR for the duration of the war. In SAR service, the Class 7 family did duty on every system in the country.

=== South West Africa ===
In 1915, shortly after the outbreak of the First World War, the German South West Africa colony was occupied by the Union Defence Forces. Since a large part of the territory's railway infrastructure and rolling stock was destroyed or damaged by retreating German forces, an urgent need arose for locomotives for use on the Cape gauge lines in that territory. In 1917, numbers 950, 952, 954, 957, 962, 967 to 969, 973, 979 and 984 were transferred to the Defence Department for service in South West Africa. One of the engines was lost at sea in the process and was subsequently replaced with Class 7A number 1000. The lost locomotive had been documented as being no. 984 but, since no. 984 was photographed in service at Walvisbaai c. 1955, this was an error.

These eleven locomotives remained in South West Africa after the war. They proved to be so successful in that territory, that more were gradually transferred there in later years. By the time the Class 24 locomotives arrived in SWA in 1949, 53 locomotives of the Class 7 family were still in use there.

Most remained there and were only transferred back to South Africa when the Class 32-000 diesel-electric locomotives replaced them in 1961. In South Africa, they remained at work in branchline service, particularly at Tarkastad and Ladysmith and also on the Touws River-Ladismith branchline, until they were finally withdrawn in 1972.

=== Industrial service ===
In 1966, two Class 7 locomotives, numbers 955 and 956, as well as four Class 7A and two Class 7B, were sold to the Zambesi Saw Mills (ZSM) in Zambia. The company worked the teak forests which stretched 100 miles (160 kilometres) to the north-west of Livingstone in Zambia, where it built one of the longest logging railways in the world to serve its sawmill at Mulobezi. These eight locomotives joined eight ex Rhodesia Railways 7th Class locomotives which had been acquired by the ZSM between 1925 and 1956.

Railway operations ceased at Mulobezi around 1972, whilst operation of the line to Livingstone was taken over by the Zambia Railways in 1973. While most of the Class 7 locomotives remained at Mulobezi out of use, no. 955 was preserved at the Livingstone Railway Museum.

=== Preservation ===
Number	Works nmr	THF / Private	Leaselend / Owner	Current Location	Outside South Africa	?
950	DUBS 2882	THF	Plinth	Upington (Station)		sole surviving Dübs example
955	NEILSON 4447	Private	Zambia Railways	Livingstone Railway Museum	Zambia	
970	NEILSON 4450	Private	Municipality	Riversdale (Town Centre)		
975	NEILSON 4469	Private	Anglo Boer War Museum	Anglo Boer War Museum (Plinth)		
980	NEILSON 4457	THF/PRASA	Plinth	Klerksdorp (Station)		
981	NEILSON 4458	THF		Bloemfontein Locomotive Depot		
982	NEILSON 4472	THF	Plinth	Aliwal North (Station)		
987	NEILSON 4477	Private	Matjiesfontein Village	Matjiesfontein Village		

== Renumbering ==
During their long service lives, some of the Class 7 locomotives were renumbered multiple times. All were initially numbered onto the Midland System roster. Some were later renumbered onto the Eastern System roster, three saw service with the IMR and were temporarily renumbered accordingly, and all were eventually renumbered onto the SAR's roster in 1912. The table lists their renumbering as well as their builders and works numbers.

Class 7 builders, works numbers and renumbering
Builder	Works Number	CGR Midland	CGR Eastern	IMR Number	SAR Number
Dübs	2882	315			950
Dübs	2883	316		C520	951
Dübs	2884	317			952
Dübs	2885	318	701		968
Dübs	2886	319			953
Dübs	2887	320	702		969
Neilson	4446	321			954
Neilson	4447	322			955
Neilson	4448	323			956
Neilson	4449	324			957
Neilson	4450	325	703		970
Neilson	4451	326	704		971
Neilson	4452	327			958
Neilson	4453	328			959
Neilson	4454	329		C524	960
Neilson	4455	330	705		978
Neilson	4456	331	706		979
Neilson	4457	332	707		980
Neilson	4458	333	708		981
Neilson	4459	334			961
Neilson	4460	335			962
Neilson	4461	336			963
Neilson	4462	337	709		972
Neilson	4463	338	710		973
Neilson	4464	339	711		974
Neilson	4465	340			964
Neilson	4466	341			965
Neilson	4467	342		C521	966
Neilson	4468	343			967
Neilson	4469	344			975
Neilson	4470	345			976
Neilson	4471	346			977
Neilson	4472	347	712		982
Neilson	4473	348	713		983
Neilson	4474	349	714		984
Neilson	4475	350	715		985
Neilson	4476	351	716		986
Neilson	4477	352	717		987

== Illustration ==
The main picture shows ex Midland System Class 7 no. 344, later SAR Class 7 no. 975, plinthed at the Women's Memorial in Bloemfontein. Of the plinthed locomotives illustrated, CGR no. 345 (SAR no. 976) at Klerksdorp is actually Midland no. 332, later Eastern no. 707 and eventually SAR no. 980. It was restored bearing the CGR number plate and builder's works plate of CGR no. 345.

The main picture shows an engine with a type ZA tender. All the locomotives illustrated below are equipped with type ZC tenders

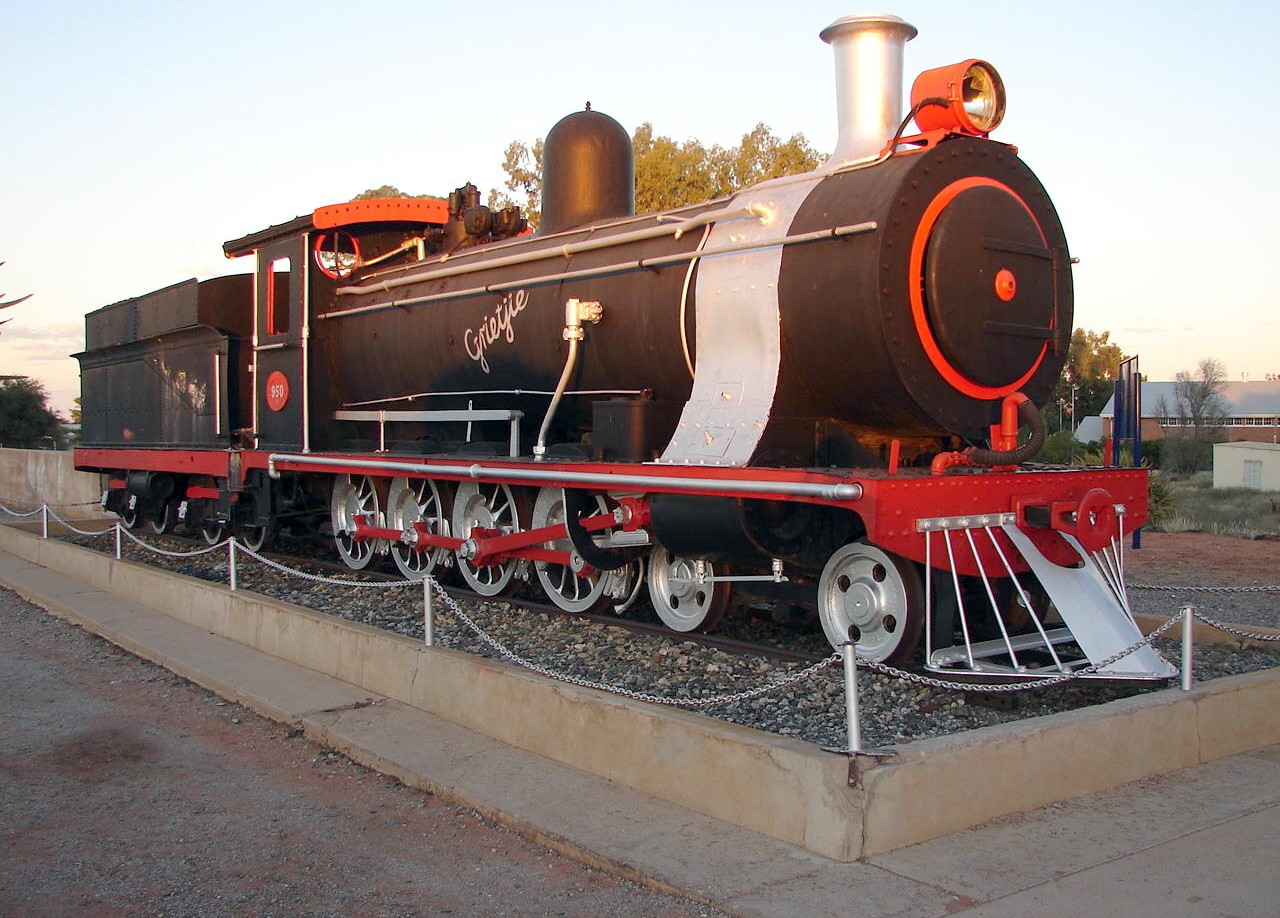
Midland no. 315, SAR no. 950, plinthed at Upington, Northern Cape, 14 May 2006

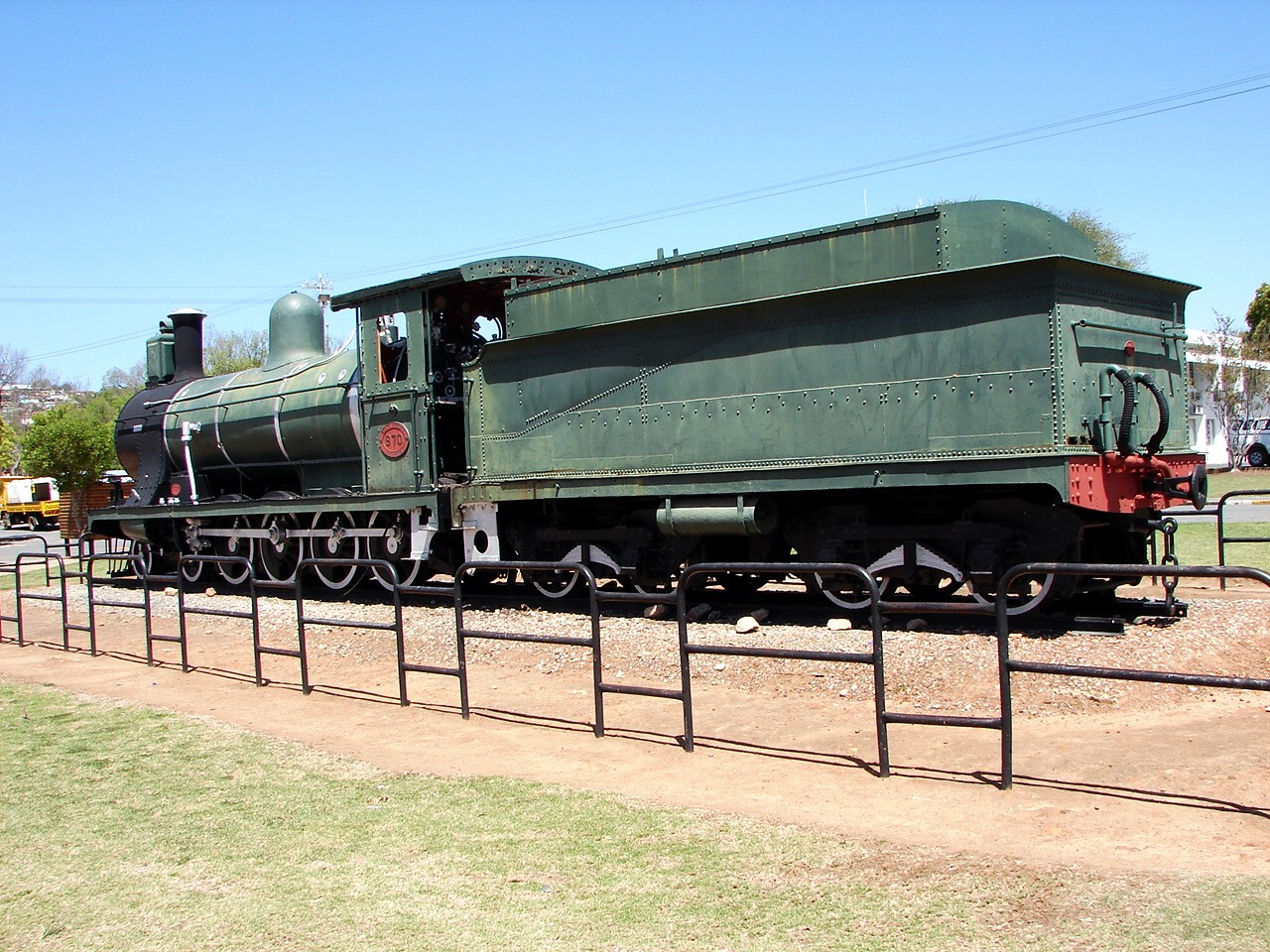
Midland no. 325, Eastern no. 703, SAR no. 970, Riversdale, 20 October 2009

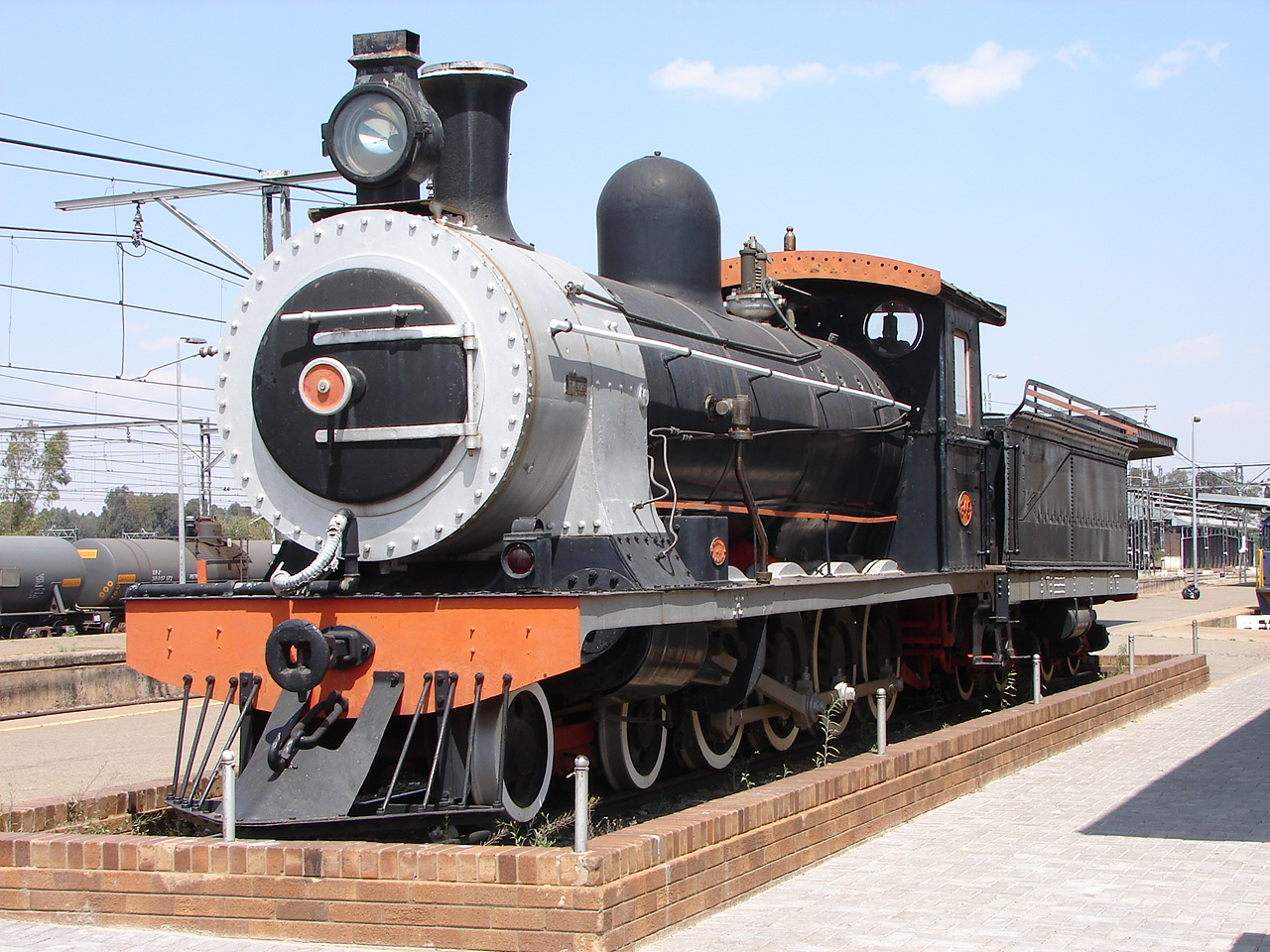
Midland no. 345, SAR no. 976, plinthed at Klerksdorp Station, North West, 20 September 2009

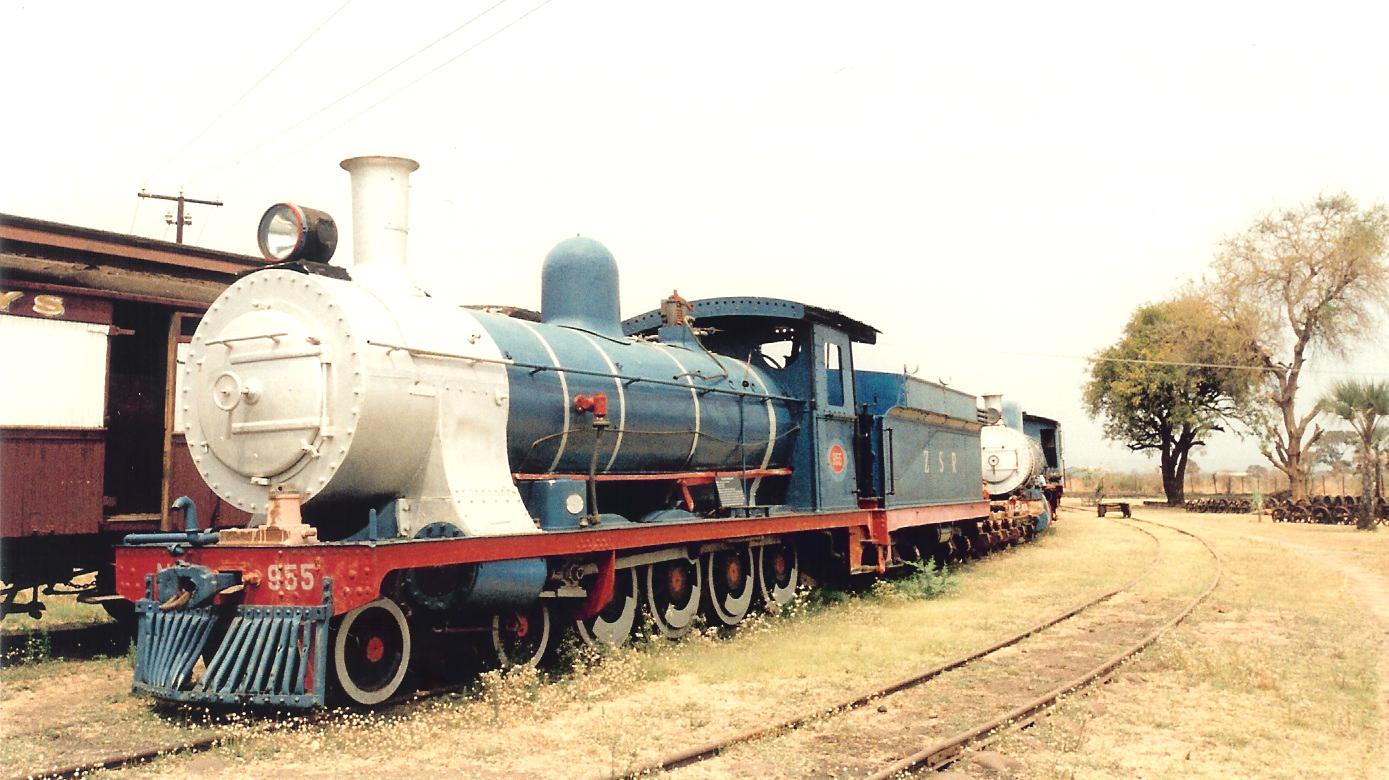
Midland no. 322, SAR no. 955, Zambesi Saw Mills (ZSM) at Livingstone in Zambia, 11 September 1997
