= South African Class 24 2-8-4 =

1949 design of steam locomotive

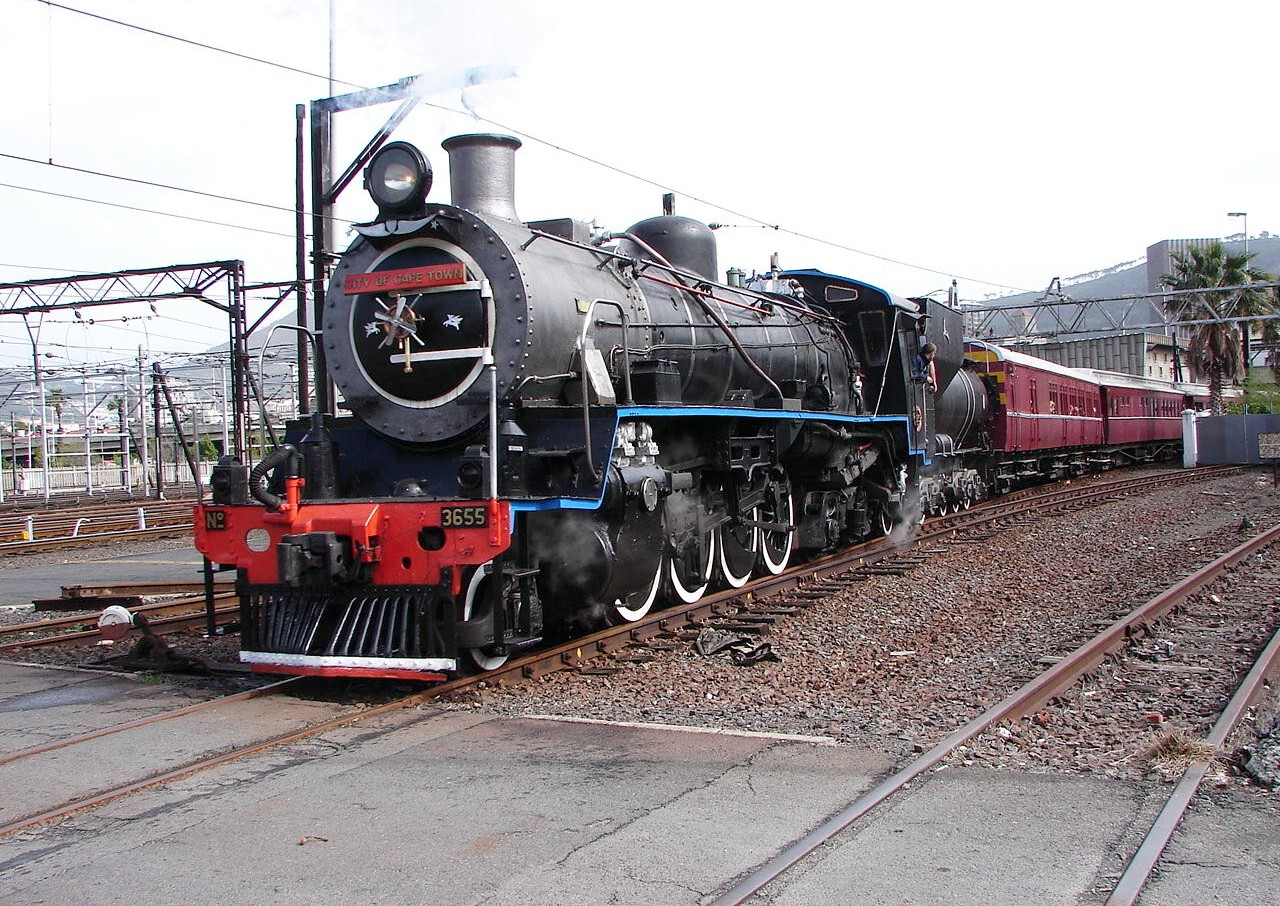
- 3655 City of Cape Town leaving Monument station, 8 August 2010
Type and origin
- Power type: Steam
- Designer: South African Railways (Dr. M.M. Loubser)
- Builder: North British Locomotive Company
- Order number: L976
- Serial number: 26313-26412
- Model: Class 24
- Build date: 1949-1950
- Total produced: 100
Specifications
- Configuration
  - Whyte: 2-8-4 (Berkshire)
  - UIC: 1′D2′h2
- Driver: 3rd coupled axle
- Gauge: 3 ft 6 in (1,067 mm) Cape gauge
- Leading dia.: 30 in (762 mm)
- Coupled dia.: 51 in (1,295 mm)
- Trailing dia.: 30 in (762 mm)
- Tender wheels: 34 in (864 mm)
- Minimum curve: 300 ft (91 m)
- Wheelbase: 65 ft 3 in (19,888 mm)
  - Engine: 31 ft (9,449 mm)
  - Coupled: 13 ft 6 in (4,115 mm)
  - Trailing: 4 ft 6 in (1,372 mm)
  - Tender: 24 ft 7 1/4 in (7,499 mm)
  - Tender bogie: 8 ft 8 in (2,642 mm)
- Length
  - Over couplers: 74 ft 9 1/4 in (22,790 mm)
- Height: 12 ft 10 7/8 in (3,934 mm)
- Frame type: Cast
- Axle load: 11 LT 10 cwt (11,680 kg)
  - Leading: 8 LT (8,128 kg)
  - 1st coupled: 11 LT (11,180 kg)
  - 2nd coupled: 11 LT 10 cwt (11,680 kg)
  - 3rd coupled: 11 LT 9 cwt (11,630 kg)
  - 4th coupled: 11 LT 5 cwt (11,430 kg)
  - Trailing: 10 LT 2 cwt (10,260 kg) leading 9 LT 12 cwt (9,754 kg) trailing
  - Tender bogie: Bogie 1: 28 LT 1 cwt (28,500 kg); Bogie 2: 28 LT 10 cwt (28,960 kg)
  - Tender axle: 9 LT 10 cwt (9,652 kg)
- Adhesive weight: 45 LT 4 cwt (45,930 kg)
- Loco weight: 72 LT 18 cwt (74,070 kg)
- Tender weight: 56 LT 11 cwt (57,460 kg)
- Total weight: 129 LT 9 cwt (131,500 kg)
- Tender type: MY (Buckeye 3-axle bogies)
- Fuel type: Coal
- Fuel capacity: 9 LT (9.1 t)
- Water cap.: 4,520 imp gal (20,500 L)
- Firebox
  - Type: Round-top
  - Grate area: 36 sq ft (3.3 m^{2})
- Boiler
  - Model: Watson Standard no. 1
  - Pitch: 8 ft (2,438 mm)
  - Diameter: 5 ft (1,524 mm)
  - Tube plates: 17 ft 9 in (5,410 mm) steel 17 ft 8 5/8 in (5,401 mm) copper
  - Small tubes: 76: 2 1/2 in (64 mm)
  - Large tubes: 24: 5 1/2 in (140 mm)
- Boiler pressure: 200 psi (1,379 kPa)
- Safety valve: Ross-pop
- Heating surface
  - Firebox: 123 sq ft (11.4 m^{2})
  - Tubes: 1,497 sq ft (139.1 m^{2})
  - Arch tubes: 16 sq ft (1.5 m^{2})
  - Total surface: 1,636 sq ft (152.0 m^{2})
- Superheater
  - Heating area: 380 sq ft (35 m^{2})
- Cylinders: Two
- Cylinder size: 19 in (483 mm) bore 26 in (660 mm) stroke
- Valve gear: Walschaerts
- Valve type: Piston
- Loco brake: Vacuum
- Couplers: AAR knuckle
Performance figures
- Tractive effort: 27,600 lbf (123 kN) @ 75%
Career
- Operators: South African Railways
- Class: Class 24
- Number in class: 100
- Numbers: 3601-3700
- Delivered: 1949-1950
- First run: 1949
- Withdrawn: 1980s
- Disposition: 20 preserved 80 scrapped

The South African Railways Class 24 2-8-4 of 1949 is a steam locomotive.

In 1949 and 1950, the South African Railways placed 100 Class 24 branch line steam locomotives with a 2-8-4 Berkshire type wheel arrangement in service.

== Manufacturer ==
By the late 1940s, the South African Railways (SAR) still had a comparatively large mileage of 45 pounds per yard (22 kilograms per metre) track. In South West Africa, where most of the locomotive fleet consisted of Classes 6, 7, GC and GCA, there were still hundreds of miles of 40 1/4 pounds per yard (20.0 kilograms per metre) track. Considering the increasing age of these locomotives, the options were either to relay these tracks with 60 pounds per yard (30 kilograms per metre) rail or to obtain new light branch line locomotives suitable for use on the existing track.

The Class 24 2-8-4 Berkshire type branch line steam locomotive was designed by Dr. M.M. Loubser, Chief Mechanical Engineer (CME) of the SAR from 1939 to 1949. The locomotives were built by North British Locomotive Company (NBL) of Glasgow, who delivered 100 of them in 1949 and 1950, numbered in the range from 3601 to 3700. The cast engine main frames and the Buckeye bogies for the tenders were supplied by General Steel Castings of Eddystone, Pennsylvania.

One of these locomotives, no. 3675, was the 2,000th locomotive to be built by NBL for the SAR and, to commemorate this milestone, a ceremony was conducted in Cape Town to name the locomotive Bartholomew Diaz after the Portuguese navigator Bartolomeu Dias who landed at the Cape of Good Hope in May 1488 and named it the Cape of Storms (Cabo das Tormentas). The ceremony was attended by the South African Minister of Transport and heads of departments of the SAR, as well as by the chairman and managing director of NBL.

== Characteristics ==
The Class 24 had a one-piece cast-steel main frame which was cast integrally with the cylinders, including the cylinder hind covers, smokebox support frame, stays and various brackets, all of which would normally be separate items riveted or bolted onto the frames. Advantages of this arrangement are reduced maintenance and less time spent in shops. It was the first South African steam locomotive to be built using this technique.

They were built with Watson Standard no. 1 boilers, while their double hopper type ashpans were specially designed to clear the four-wheeled trailing bogies. Their specially designed Type MY tenders were similar in appearance to the Type MX and the North American Vanderbilt type tenders, with cylindrical water tanks. The tenders rode on three-axle Buckeye bogies to reduce the axle load and, along with the Type MX, became commonly known as Torpedo tenders.

The piston valves were actuated by Walschaerts valve gear and the standard SAR type steam reversing gear was arranged on the right-hand side. The engine and tender were both equipped with vacuum brakes and the engine's two 21 inches (533 millimetres) diameter vacuum cylinders were arranged outside the engine's frame and under the running boards, one on either side. The valve gear, brake gear and coupled wheel hubs were soft grease lubricated, while the bronze axle boxes had hard grease lubrication. The leading and trailing bogies were fitted with roller bearing axle boxes while the tender's bogies used plain bearings.

== Service ==
The Class 24 was built to replace the old Classes 6, 7 and 8 locomotives in branch line service on light rail. When they were introduced, an elaborate programme was drawn up to show on which systems and on what sections they were to be employed.

- The Cape Western System, on the Saldanha-Kalbaskraal, Porterville-Hermon and Prince Alfred Hamlet-Wolseley sections.
- The Cape Midland System, on the Knysna-George, Alexandra-Barkly Bridge, Kirkwood-Addo and Somerset East-Cookhouse sections.
- The Orange Free State System, on the Dover-Vredefort, Wolwehoek-Arlington-Marquard, Theunissen-Winburg, Westleigh-Orkney and Vierfontein-Bultfontein sections.
- The Eastern Transvaal System, on the Soekmekaar-Komatipoort, Barberton-Kaapmuiden, Middelburg-Stoffberg, Brits-Beestekraal and Zebediela-Naboomspruit sections.
- The South West Africa System, on the De Aar-Karasburg and Keetmanshoop-Windhoek sections.

Most of them went to the South West Africa System, where 55 of them would be in operation. From some time between 1955 and 1959, they were also employed on the Keetmanshoop-Walvisbaai section. They remained in that territory until 1961, when strengthening of the track and the complete dieselisation of the South West Africa System made them available to be employed elsewhere.

Other branch lines to be served by the Class 24 include Breyten to Lothair, Nylstroom to Vaalwater, Port Elizabeth to Alexandra and George to Knysna. As a relatively powerful locomotive, they were also useful as suburban locomotives, a role they served in on the Springs-Nigel commuter line until electrification. Some eventually also worked on the Selati line in the Transvaal Lowveld. Heavy overhauls were done at Bloemfontein. The only province where they were unknown was Natal.

The Calvinia and Sakrivier branches had been worked almost exclusively by Class 19C locomotives from about 1950, but from 1951 two Class 24s were also allocated to Beaufort West and sub-shedded at Hutchinson. After February 1963, this was reduced to one Class 24 locomotive until long after the branch was dieselised c. 1960, using Class 32-000 locomotives based at De Aar. For some six months in the latter half of 1969, the Calvinia and Sakrivier branches reverted to steam-only operation when there was a huge surge in ore traffic that required the drafting in of more Class 32-000 locomotives to the Port Elizabeth mainline. A pair of Class 24 locomotives temporarily worked those branches in 1969 and 1970 as relief engines during the diesel-electric locomotive shortage.

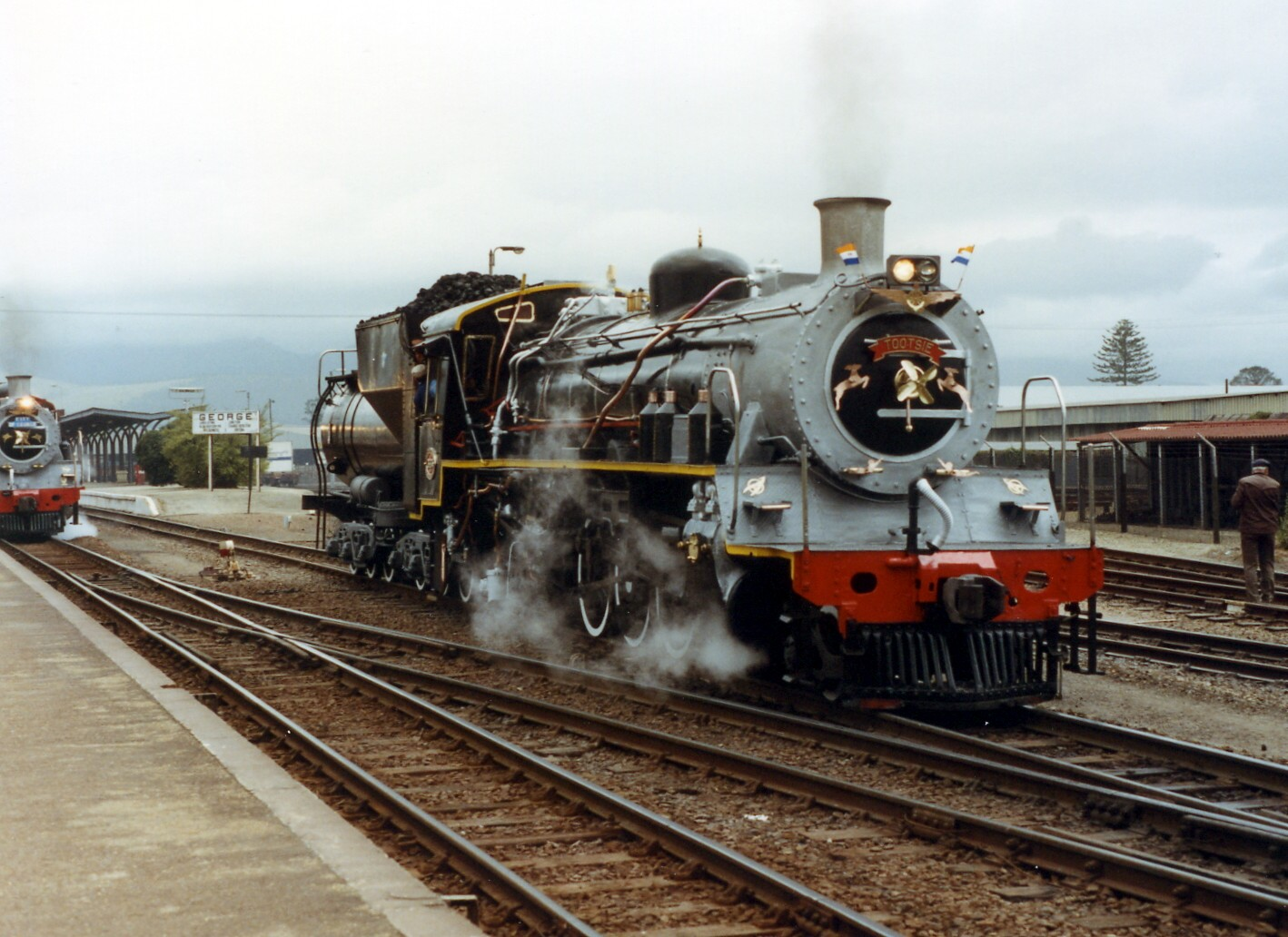
No. 3632 Tootsie at George, Cape Province, 29 September 1989

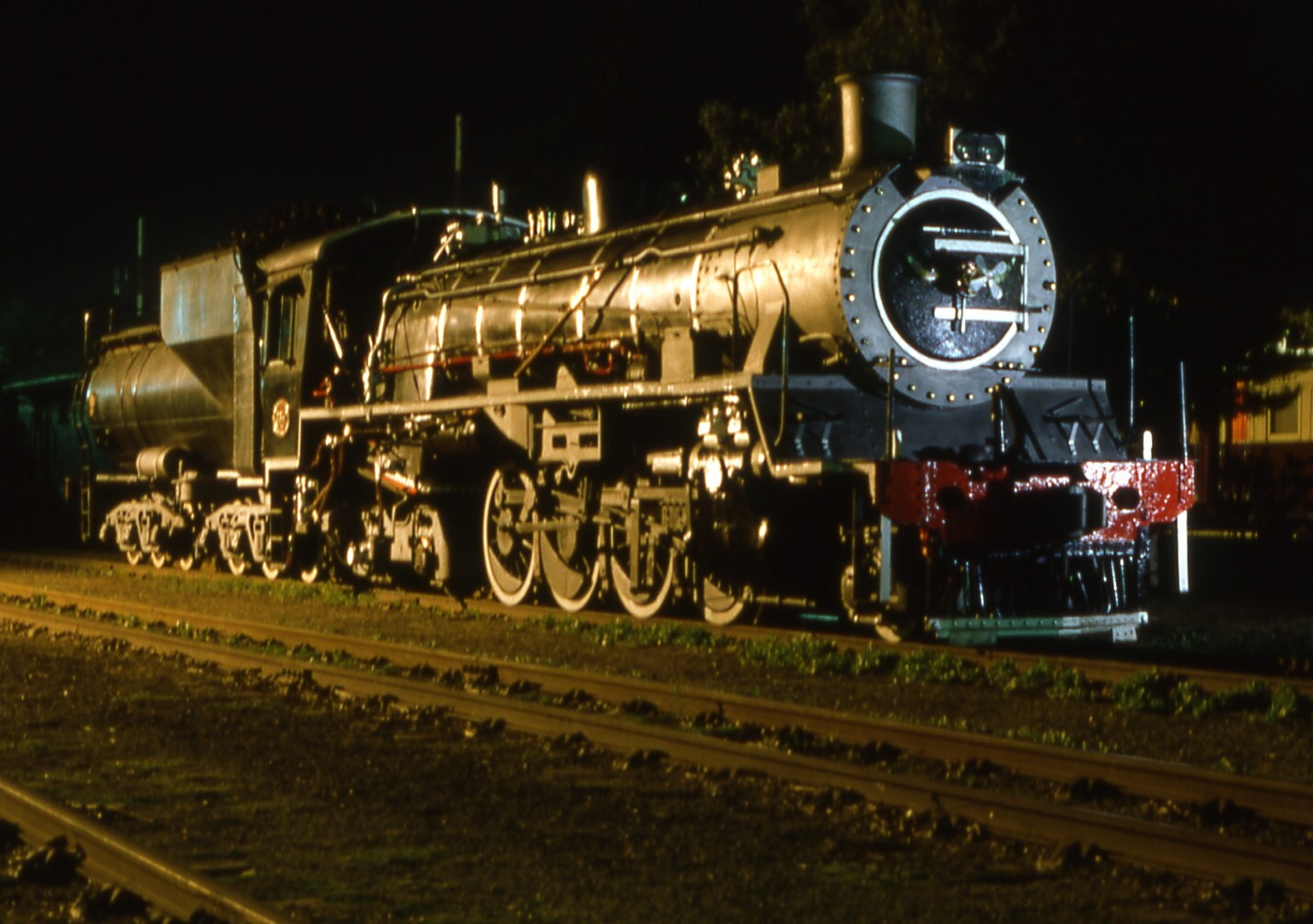
Preserved no. 3693 at Oudtshoorn, Cape Province, c. 1991. It was scrapped in 2016.

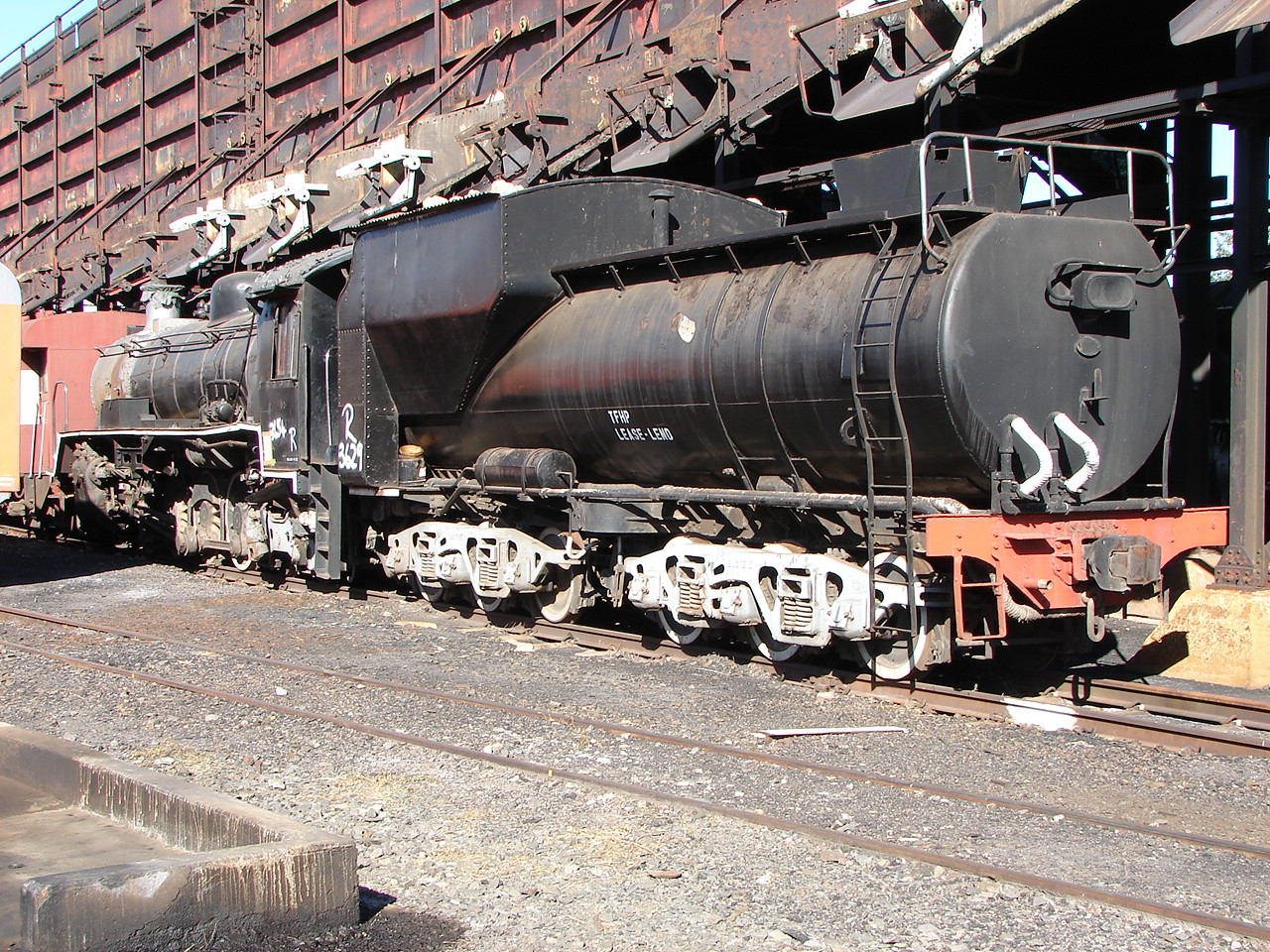
No. 3654 staged at Beaconsfield, Kimberley, 17 September 2009

== Preservation ==
The following is a list of 24 class that have survived into preservation. 1 January 2019

Number	Works nmr.	THF / Private	Leaselend / Owner	Current Location	Outside South Africa	Notes
3606	NBl 26318	THF		Voorbaai Locomotive Depot		
3608	NBL 26320	Private	Calvinia Museum	Calvinia Museum		
3611	NBL 26323	Private	TransNamib Ltd	Keetmanshoop Locomotive Depot	Namibia	
3612	NBL 26324	Private	TransNamib Ltd	Keetmanshoop Locomotive Depot	Namibia	
3620	NBL 26332	Private	Ian Welch & The Q Train	Bellarine Railway	Australia	Purchased by Main Line Steam Trust, Auckland, New Zealand in 1997, sold to Cairns, Australia in 2001
3631	NBL 26343	Private	Ian Welch	Bloemfontein Locomotive Depot		
3632	NBL 26344	Private	Ian Welch & Dylan Knott	Robertson, WC (NCCR)		
3635	NBL 26347	THF		Voorbaai Locomotive Depot		
3638	NBL 26350	Private	National Parks Board	Kruger National Park		
3645	NBL 26357	THF		Krugersdorp Locomotive Depot		
3647	NBL 26359	Private	Greg McLennan	Germiston Locomotive Depot		
3654	NBL 26366	THF	Steamnet 2000	Kimberley Locomotive Depot		
3655	NBL 26367	Private	Grant Bradley	Voorbaai Locomotive Depot (Southern Cape Railway)		
3664	NBL 26376	THF		Hermanstad (station)		Sectioned for display
3667	NBL 26379	THF		Queenstown Locomotive Depot		
3668	NBL 26380	THF	Transnet Heritage Foundation	Outiniqua Transport Museum		Selected as Transnet Heritage Foundation representative of the class (National Collection)
3675	NBL 26387	THF		Voorbaai Locomotive Depot		
3688	NBL 26400	THF	Sandstone Estate	Sandstone Estate		
3689	NBL 26401	Private	Greg McLennan	Voorbaai Locomotive Depot		
3690	NBL 26402	Private	Ian Welch	Bloemfontein Locomotive Depot		
