= South African steam locomotive tenders =

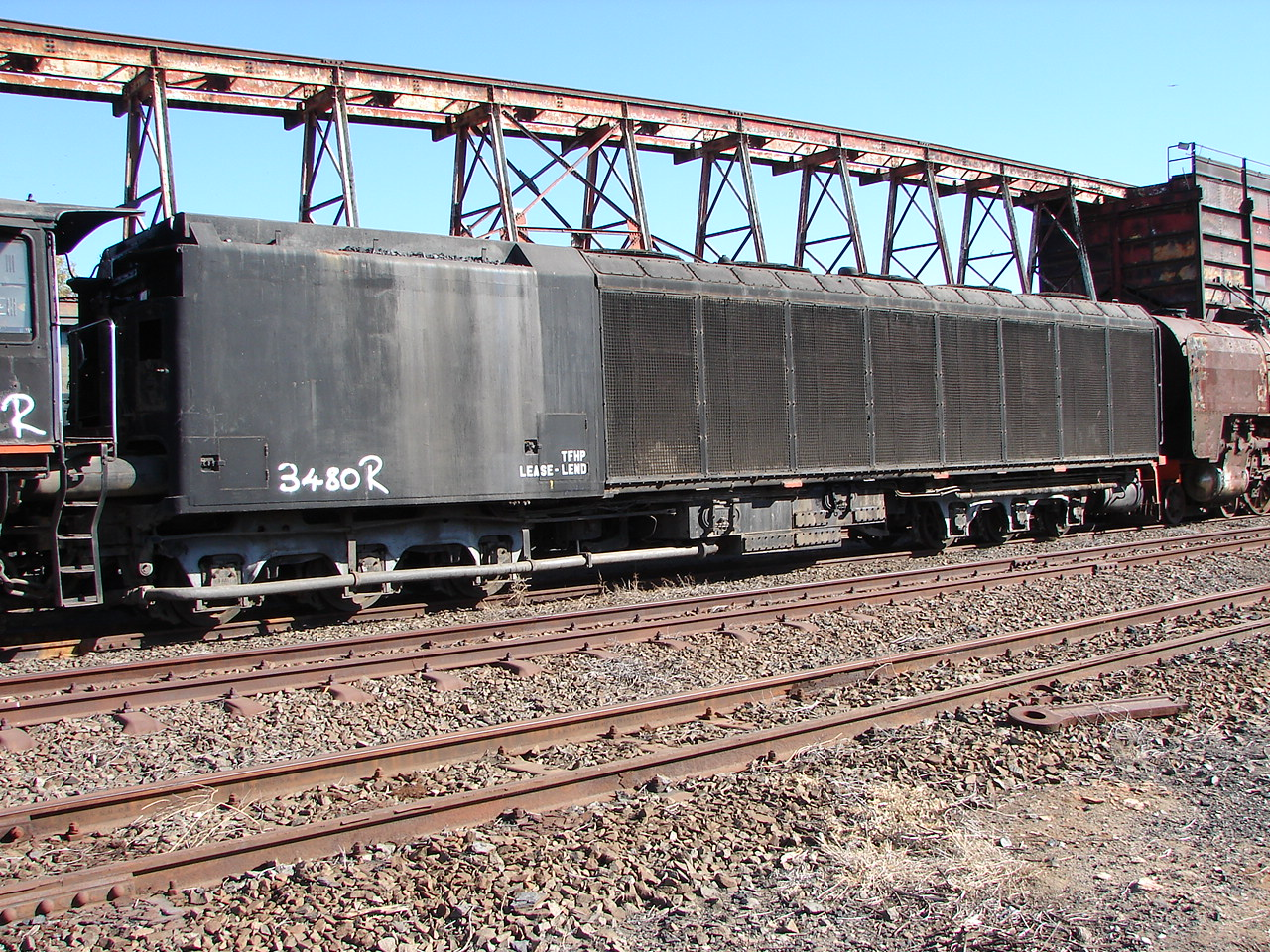
Type CZ condensing tender of the Class 25

South African steam locomotive tenders were classified by means of type letters and sometimes numbers, while locomotive specifications included a list of permissible tenders which could be used with each engine class.

== Railway development ==
In South Africa, all early mainline railway construction took place working inland from harbours and ports. Construction of these lines began in the years from 1859 to 1887.

- Cape Western – The Cape Town-Wellington line in 1859.
- Namaqualand – The Port Nolloth-O'okiep line in 1869.
- Cape Midland – The Port Elizabeth-Uitenhage line in 1872.
- Cape Midland – The Swartkops-Alicedale line in 1875.
- Natal – The Durban-Pietermaritzburg line in 1876.
- Cape Eastern – The East London-King William's Town line in 1876.
- Kowie – The Port Alfred-Grahamstown line in 1881.
- Transvaal – The Delagoa Bay-Pretoria line in 1887.

On most of these lines, the first locomotives were tank engines, which were in most instances acquired specifically for use during line construction. The first revenue-earning locomotives, on the other hand, were often tender engines from the outset, most notably on the three systems of the Cape Government Railways (CGR). At the other end of the spectrum and in spite of their inherent limited coal and water capacities, the Natal Government Railways (NGR) struggled on with tank locomotives in mainline service until 1904, before it finally adopted tender locomotives, while the Nederlandsche-Zuid-Afrikaansche Spoorweg-Maatschappij (NZASM) relied exclusively on tank engines for the full duration of its existence.

== Early tenders ==
In 1860, the Cape Town Railway & Dock 0-4-2 of the Cape Town-Wellington Railway was the first tender locomotive type to enter mainline service in South Africa. The first of these came ashore in Cape Town on 20 March of that year. It had a small two-axle tender with a 1,250 imperial gallons (5,680 litres) water capacity.

Early CGR mainline locomotives were tank-and-tender engines with optional tenders, which were usually only used during longer trips. The first of these was the CGR 2nd Class 2-6-2TT, which entered service on all three systems of the CGR in 1875 and 1876. It also used a two-axle tender, with a 2 long tons (2.0 tonnes) coal and a 900 imperial gallons (4,090 litres) water capacity.

The first three-axle tenders appeared in South Africa during the following year, also on the CGR, on the two versions of the CGR 1st Class 2-6-0 by Beyer, Peacock and Kitson respectively. Both entered service in 1876.

The first bogie tenders in South Africa were also three-axle vehicles, on the CGR Eastern System's 3rd Class 4-4-0 and 4th Class 4-6-0TT of 1884. Both used the same tender, which had the leading axle mounted in a rigid frame, while the other two axles were mounted in a bogie.

The first proper bogie tenders to enter service in South Africa, with two two-axle bogies, came with the first batch of the CGR 7th Class 4-8-0 of 1892.

== Tender type classification ==
The South African Railways (SAR) era began in 1910, upon the amalgamation of the three former Colonial railways, the CGR, NGR and Central South African Railways (CSAR). Since many tender types are interchangeable between different locomotive classes and types, most South African tender steam locomotives could be equipped with a variety of different tender types, with different coal and water capacities. A tender classification system was therefore adopted by the SAR. Tenders were classified by means of type letters and sometimes numbers, while the specifications of most individual locomotive classes included a list of permissible tender types which could be used with each class.

Tenders of locomotives which were considered obsolete in 1912, when the renumbering of locomotives of the three component railways onto the SAR roster was implemented, were not classified. The type classification is made up of two letters and, when required, a number.

== Type letter codes ==
=== First letter ===
The first letter of the tender type indicates the classes of engines to which it can be coupled.

Locomotives	1st letter	Actual tender type
Class Exp 4	X_	XE1, XF
Class Exp 5	X_	XF2
Class Exp 6	X_	XF2
Class MC	T_	TM
Class MC1	M_	MP1
Class ME	X_	XF
Class MF	X_	XM4, XS
Class MH	M_	MP1
Class MJ	M_	MP1
Class MJ1	L_	LP
Class S	G_	GT
Class S1	J_	JT1
Class S2	M_	MY1
Class 1	S_	SH, SK
Class 1A	T_	TJ, TL
Class 2	S_	SH, SK
Class 2C	T_	TJ, TL
Class 3	T_	TJ, TL, TM
Class 3B	T_	TL, TM
Class 4	X_	XJ
Class 4A	X_	XM
Class 5	X_	XM2
Class 5A	Y_	YE
Class 5B	Y_	YE1
Class 6	Y_	YB
Class 6A	Y_	YC
Class 6B	X_	XC1, XE
Class 6C	Y_	YC
Class 6D	Y_	YC
Class 6E	X_	XC1, XE
Class 6G	W_	WE
Class 6H	X_	XD, XF
Class 6J	X_	XD, XF
Class 6Y	Y_	YE
Class 6Z	Y_	YE
Class 7	Z_	ZA, ZB
Class 7A	Z_	ZC, ZE
Class 7B	Z_	ZC, ZE
Class 7C	Z_	ZC, ZE
Class 7D	Z_	ZC
Class 7E	Z_	ZC
Class 7F	Z_	ZC
Class 8	X_	XD, XE1, XF
Class 8A	X_	XF
Class 8B	X_	XF
Class 8C	X_	XF
Class 8D	X_	XE1, XF
Class 8E	X_	XE1, XF
Class 8F	X_	XE1, XF
Class 8R	W_	WG
Class 8X	W_	WG
Class 8Y	X_	XE1, XF
Class 8Z	X_	XE1, XF
Class 9	X_	XM3
Class 10	X_	XM2, XP1
Class 10A	X_	XM2
Class 10B	X_	XM2
Class 10C	X_	XC, XM2
Class 11	X_	XM2
Class 12	M_	MP1, MR
Class 12A	M_	MP1, MR, MT
Class 12B	M_	MP1, MR
Class 14	M_	MP1
Class 14A	M_	MP1, MR
Class 14B	M_	MP1, MR
Class 14C	L_	LP
Class 15	M_	MP1, MR
Class 15A	M_	MP1, MR
Class 15B	L_	LP
Class 15CA	K_	KT
Class 15CB	K_	KT
Class 15E	J_	JT
Class 15F	J_	JT
Class 15F stoker	E_	ET, EW
Class 16	M_	MP1, MR
Class 16A	M_	MP1, MR
Class 16B	M_	MP1, MR
Class 16C	M_	MP1, MR
Class 16D	K_	KT
Class 16DA	K_	KT
Class 16E	J_	JT
Class 18	H_	HT
Class 19	M_	MS
Class 19A	M_	MP
Class 19B	M_	MT
Class 19C	M_	MT
Class 19D	M_	MT, MX
Class 20	M_	MP1, CL
Class 21	F_	FT
Class 23	E_	EW
Class 24	M_	MY
Class 25	C_	CZ
Class 25NC	E_	EW1, EW2
Class 26	E_	EW1

=== Second letter ===
The second letter of the tender type, or letter and number, indicate the tender's water capacity.

Letter	Water capacity
A	2,220 imperial gallons (10,100 litres; 2,670 US gallons)
B	2,370 imperial gallons (10,800 litres; 2,850 US gallons)
C	2,590–2,600 imperial gallons (11,800–11,800 litres; 3,110–3,120 US gallons)
C1	2,590–2,600 imperial gallons (11,800–11,800 litres; 3,110–3,120 US gallons)
D	2,730–2,780 imperial gallons (12,400–12,600 litres; 3,280–3,340 US gallons)
E	2,800–2,855 imperial gallons (12,700–13,000 litres; 3,360–3,430 US gallons)
E1	2,800–2,855 imperial gallons (12,700–13,000 litres; 3,360–3,430 US gallons)
F	3,000 imperial gallons (13,600 litres; 3,600 US gallons)
F1	3,000 imperial gallons (13,600 litres; 3,600 US gallons)
F2	3,000 imperial gallons (13,600 litres; 3,600 US gallons)
G	3,080 imperial gallons (14,000 litres; 3,700 US gallons)
H	3,225 imperial gallons (14,700 litres; 3,870 US gallons)
J	3,500 imperial gallons (15,900 litres; 4,200 US gallons)
K	3,675 imperial gallons (16,700 litres; 4,410 US gallons)
L	3,900 imperial gallons (17,700 litres; 4,680 US gallons)
M	4,000 imperial gallons (18,200 litres; 4,800 US gallons)
M2	4,000 imperial gallons (18,200 litres; 4,800 US gallons)
M3	4,000 imperial gallons (18,200 litres; 4,800 US gallons)
M4	4,000 imperial gallons (18,200 litres; 4,800 US gallons)
P	4,250 imperial gallons (19,300 litres; 5,100 US gallons)
P1	4,250 imperial gallons (19,300 litres; 5,100 US gallons)
R	4,600 imperial gallons (20,900 litres; 5,520 US gallons)
S	5,000 imperial gallons (22,700 litres; 6,000 US gallons)
T	5,587–6,000 imperial gallons (25,400–27,300 litres; 6,710–7,210 US gallons)
T1	6,000 imperial gallons (27,300 litres; 7,210 US gallons)
V	7,250–7,500 imperial gallons (33,000–34,100 litres; 8,710–9,010 US gallons)
W	9,200–10,000 imperial gallons (41,800–45,500 litres; 11,000–12,000 US gallons)
W1	10,500 imperial gallons (47,700 litres; 12,600 US gallons)
W2	11,200 imperial gallons (50,900 litres; 13,500 US gallons)
X	6,500 imperial gallons (29,500 litres; 7,810 US gallons)
Y	4,500–4,520 imperial gallons (20,500–20,500 litres; 5,400–5,430 US gallons)
Y1	4,200 imperial gallons (19,100 litres; 5,040 US gallons)
Z	5,000 imperial gallons (22,700 litres; 6,000 US gallons)

A number, when added after the letter code, indicates differences between similar tender types, such as function, wheelbase or coal bunker capacity.

== Permissible tenders ==
Tender types other than those specified on each locomotive diagram, were not allowed to be coupled to the engines concerned without the approval of the Chief Civil Engineer. Even in respect of some permissible tenders, it was sometimes necessary to make slight structural alterations before the substitution of a tender with the same initial letter designation could be effected.

- Any alterations to pipes between the engine and tender, if necessary to suit the class of engine concerned, were to be done on the tender only.
- Fallplates between engines and tenders were to be of sufficient length to obviate the plate falling between the buffer beams in the event of drawbar failure, and emergency chains or links had to be adjusted in this regard, where necessary.
- Where necessary, fallplate hinges were to be attached to the engine.
- Special attention had to be paid to drawbar clearance in the drawbar pockets. Where clearance was insufficient, the buffer beam could be cut away within reason, and where clearance was excessive, a suitable packing washer could be inserted under the engine end of the drawbar, while taking care that there was ample clearance between the drawbar and the top of the opening in the tender.
- Any difficulty experienced in coupling any combination of engine and tender, had to be reported to the office of the Chief Mechanical Engineer.

Tenders which had been altered to suit engines fitted with rigid platforms, had to be reserved for such engines only, unless instructed otherwise by the office of the Chief Mechanical Engineer.

== Reclassification ==
Several tender types were reclassified, for various reasons.

- From Type CZ to Type EW2, condensing equipment replaced by a D-shaped water tank.
- From Type ET to Type ET1, bunker enlarged to 16 long tons (16.3 tonnes) coal capacity.
- From Type MP1 to Type MR, alteration to the existing water tank.
- From Type MP1 to Type XP1, alteration to the intermediate and buffing gear.
- From Type MT to Type MT1, bunker enlarged to 13 long tons (13.2 tonnes) coal capacity.
- From Type MT to Type MT2, bunker enlarged to 14 long tons (14.2 tonnes) coal capacity.
- From Type SH to Type SK, rebuilt with a new water tank.
- From Type TJ to Type TL, rebuilt with a new water tank.
- From Type TM to Type TL, rebuilt with a new water tank.
- From Type TM to Type XM1, alteration to the intermediate and buffing gear.
- From Type XC1 to Type XE, rebuilt with a new water tank.
- From Type XD to Type XF, rebuilt with a new water tank.
- From Type XE1 to Type XF, rebuilt with a new water tank.
- From Type ZC to Type ZE, rebuilt with a new water tank.
