= South African type YE1 tender =

Steam locomotive

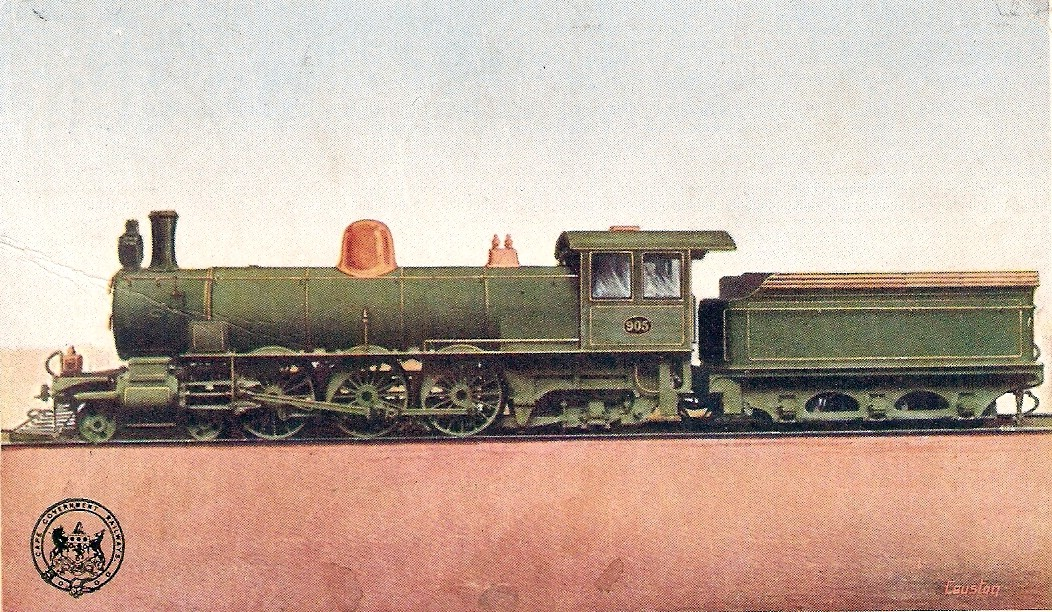
- Type YE1 tender on CGR Karoo Class of 1904
Type and origin
- Locomotive: CGR Karoo Class of 1904
- Designer: Hazlitt Beatty
- Builder: Beyer, Peacock & Company
- In service: 1904
Specifications
- Configuration: 3-axle
- Gauge: 3 ft 6 in (1,067 mm) Cape gauge
- Length: 21 ft 4 3/8 in (6,512 mm)
- Wheel dia.: 37 in (940 mm)
- Wheelbase: 10 ft 6 in (3,200 mm)
- Axle load: 11 LT 6 cwt 3 qtr (11,520 kg) av.
- Weight empty: 34,470 lb (15,640 kg)
- Weight w/o: 34 LT (34,550 kg)
- Fuel type: Coal
- Fuel cap.: 6 LT (6.1 t)
- Water cap.: 2,825 imp gal (12,800 L)
- Stoking: Manual
- Couplers: Drawbar & Johnston link-and-pin
Career
- Operators: Cape Government Railways; South African Railways
- Numbers: SAR 723-726

The South African type YE1 tender was a steam locomotive tender from the pre-Union era in the Cape of Good Hope.

The Type YE1 tender entered service in 1904, as tenders to the second batch of four Karoo Class 4-6-2 Pacific type steam locomotives of the Cape Government Railways, which would be designated Class 5B on the South African Railways in 1912.

== Manufacturer ==
Type YE1 tenders were built by Beyer, Peacock & Company in 1904.

The Cape Government Railways (CGR) placed four more Karoo Class steam locomotives with a 4-6-2 Pacific type wheel arrangement in service in 1904. The original Karoo Class locomotive and tender had been designed at the Salt River works in Cape Town by Chief Locomotive Superintendent Hazlitt Beatty in 1903. This second batch of locomotives was built to a slightly modified design and would be designated Class 5B on the South African Railways (SAR) in 1912. The Type YE1 entered service as tenders to these four engines.

== Characteristics ==
The Type YE1 tender had a coal capacity of 6 long tons (6.1 tonnes), a water capacity of 2,825 imperial gallons (12,800 litres) and an average maximum axle loading of 11 long tons 6 hundredweight 3 quarters (11,520 kilograms). The tender had the same dimensions and water capacity as the Type YE tender, but a 10 long hundredweight (0.5 tonnes) bigger coal capacity and a 6 inches (152 millimetres) longer wheelbase.

== Locomotive ==
In the SAR years, tenders were numbered for the engines they were delivered with. In most cases, an oval number plate, bearing the engine number and often also the tender type, would be attached to the rear end of the tender. During the classification and renumbering of locomotives onto the SAR roster in 1912, no separate classification and renumbering list was published for tenders, which should have been renumbered according to the locomotive renumbering list.

Only Class 5B locomotives were delivered new with Type YE1 tenders. Bearing in mind that tenders could and did migrate between engines, they should have been numbered in the SAR number range from 723 to 726.

== Classification letters ==
Since many tender types are interchangeable between different locomotive classes and types, a tender classification system was adopted by the SAR. The first letter of the tender type indicates the classes of engines to which it could be coupled. The "Y_" tenders could be used with the locomotive classes as shown.

- CGR Karoo Class of 1903, SAR Class 5A
- CGR Karoo Class of 1904, SAR Class 5B
- CGR 6th Class of 1893, SAR Class 6
- CGR 6th Class of 1896, SAR Class 6A
- Oranje-Vrijstaat Gouwerment-Spoorwegen 6th Class L2, SAR Class 6C
- CGR 6th Class of 1898, SAR Class 6D
- CGR 6th Class 2-6-2, SAR Class 6Y
- CGR 6th Class 2-6-4, SAR Class 6Z

The second letter indicates the tender's water capacity. The "_E" tenders had a capacity of between 2,800 and 2,855 imperial gallons (12,700 and 13,000 litres; 3,360 and 3,430 US gallons).

A number, when added after the letter code, indicates differences between similar tender types, such as function, wheelbase or coal bunker capacity.

== Modification ==
The original slatted upper sides of the Type YE1 tender's coal bunker were soon extended higher or replaced by sheet-metal sides.

== Illustration ==
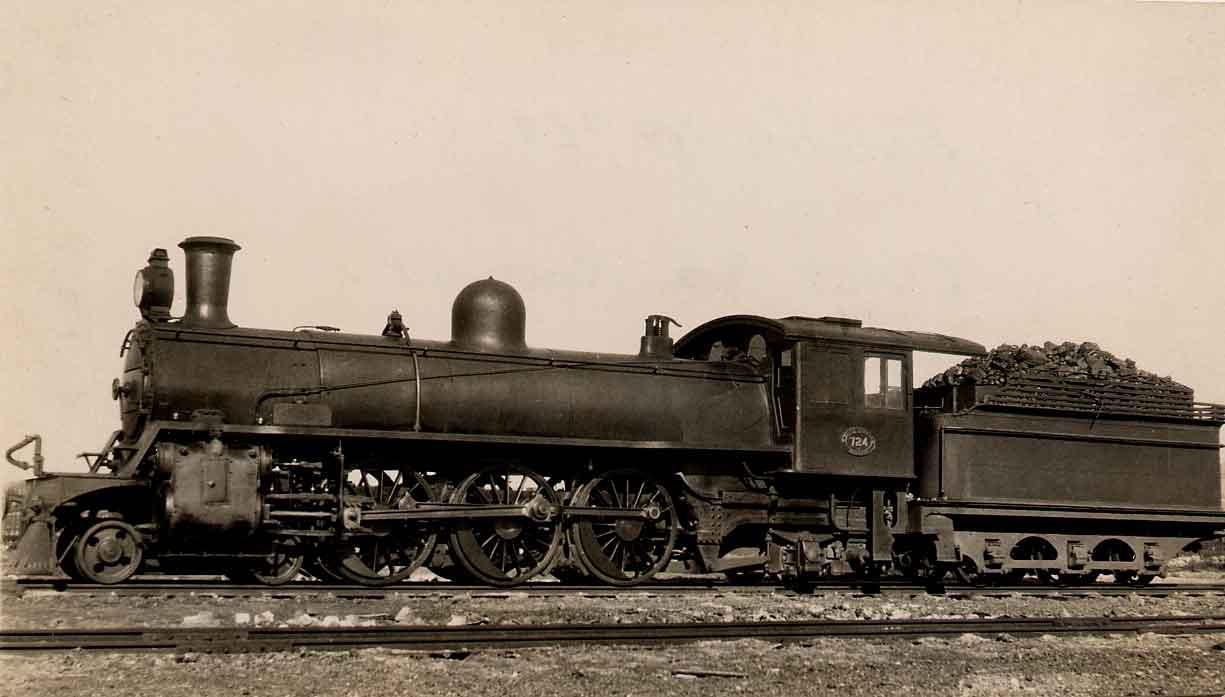
Modified Type YE1 on SAR Class 5B, c. 1930
