= South African Class 6D 4-6-0 =

1898 design of steam locomotive

CGR 6th Class 4-6-0 1898 South African Class 6D 4-6-0
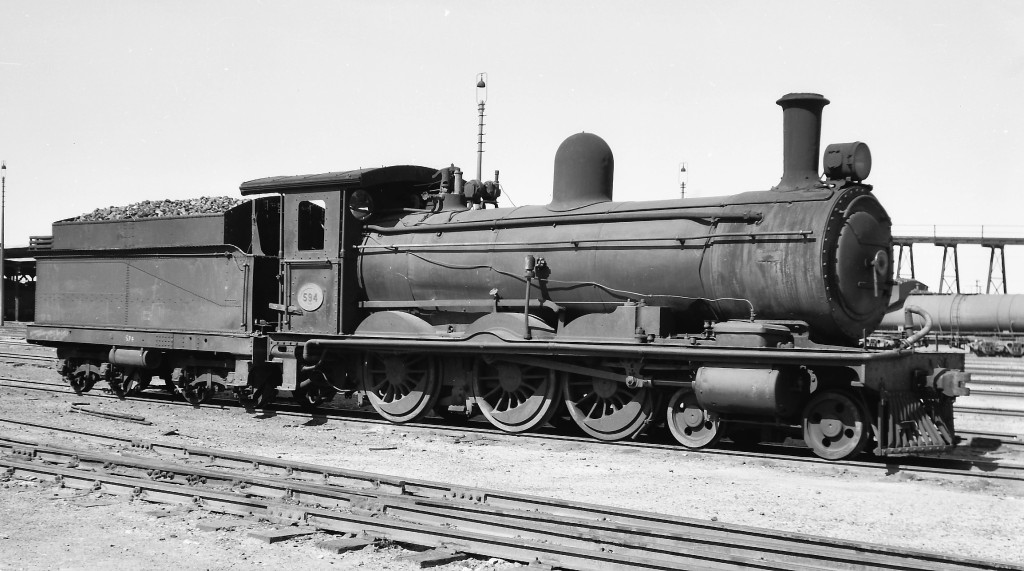
- CGR Eastern System 6th Class no. 665, SAR Class 6D no. 594, Sydenham Loco, 29 December 1965
Type and origin
- ♠ Original locomotive, as built ♥ Reboilered locomotive
- Power type: Steam
- Designer: Cape Government Railways (H.M. Beatty)
- Builder: Neilson, Reid and Company
- Serial number: 5240–5272
- Model: CGR 6th Class
- Build date: 1898
- Total produced: 33
Specifications
- Configuration
  - Whyte: 4-6-0 (Tenwheeler)
  - UIC: 2'Cn2
- Driver: 2nd coupled axle
- Gauge: 3 ft 6 in (1,067 mm) Cape gauge
- Leading dia.: 28 1/2 in (724 mm)
- Coupled dia.: 54 in (1,372 mm)
- Tender wheels: 37 in (940 mm)
- Wheelbase: 42 ft 8 5/8 in (13,021 mm)
  - Axle spacing (Asymmetrical): 1-2: 4 ft 9 in (1,448 mm); 2-3: 6 ft 7 in (2,007 mm)
  - Engine: 20 ft 7 3/4 in (6,293 mm)
  - Leading: 5 ft 5 1/2 in (1,664 mm)
  - Coupled: 11 ft 4 in (3,454 mm)
  - Tender: 10 ft (3,048 mm)
- Length
  - Over couplers: 51 ft 11 5/8 in (15,840 mm)
- Height: 12 ft 10 in (3,912 mm)
- Frame type: Plate
- Axle load: 12 LT 10 cwt (12,700 kg)
  - Leading: 11 LT 4 cwt (11,380 kg)
  - 1st coupled: 11 LT 19 cwt (12,140 kg)
  - 2nd coupled: 12 LT 10 cwt (12,700 kg)
  - 3rd coupled: 12 LT 10 cwt (12,700 kg)
  - Tender axle: 10 LT 8 cwt (10,570 kg) average
- Adhesive weight: 36 LT 19 cwt (37,540 kg)
- Loco weight: 48 LT 3 cwt (48,920 kg)
- Tender weight: 31 LT 4 cwt (31,700 kg)
- Total weight: 79 LT 7 cwt (80,620 kg)
- Tender type: YC (3-axle); YB, YC, YE, YE1 permitted
- Fuel type: Coal
- Fuel capacity: 5 LT 10 cwt (5.6 t)
- Water cap.: 2,590 imp gal (11,770 L)
- Firebox
  - Type: Round-top
  - Grate area: 18 sq ft (1.7 m^{2})
- Boiler
  - Pitch: 6 ft 8 in (2,032 mm)
  - Diameter: 4 ft 4 in (1,321 mm)
  - Tube plates: 11 ft 2 1/8 in (3,407 mm)
  - Small tubes: 185: 1 7/8 in (48 mm)
- Boiler pressure: ♠ 160 psi (1,103 kPa) ♥ 180 psi (1,241 kPa)
- Safety valve: Ramsbottom
- Heating surface
  - Firebox: 107 sq ft (9.9 m^{2})
  - Tubes: 1,015 sq ft (94.3 m^{2})
  - Total surface: 1,122 sq ft (104.2 m^{2})
- Cylinders: Two
- Cylinder size: 17 in (432 mm) bore 26 in (660 mm) stroke
- Valve gear: Stephenson
- Couplers: Johnston link-and-pin AAR knuckle (1930s)
Performance figures
- Tractive effort: ♠ 16,690 lbf (74.2 kN) @ 75% ♥ 18,780 lbf (83.5 kN) @ 75%
Career
- Operators: Cape Government Railways; South African Railways; Sudan Railways
- Class: CGR 6th Class, SAR Class 6D
- Number in class: 33
- Numbers: CGR 234-259, 585, 586 & 594, 665-668; SAR 565-597; Sudan M714-M715
- Delivered: 1898
- First run: 1898
- Withdrawn: 1973

The South African Railways Class 6D 4-6-0 of 1898 was a steam locomotive from the pre-Union era in the Cape of Good Hope.

In 1898, a fourth batch of 33 6th Class 4-6-0 steam locomotives were placed in service by the Cape Government Railways. In 1912, when these locomotives were assimilated into the South African Railways, they were renumbered and designated Class 6D.

== Manufacturer ==
The original 6th Class 4-6-0 passenger steam locomotive was designed at the Salt River works of the Cape Government Railways (CGR) in 1893, at the same time as the 7th Class and both according to the specifications of Michael Stephens, at the time Chief Locomotive Superintendent of the CGR, and under the supervision of H.M. Beatty, at the time Locomotive Superintendent of the Western System.

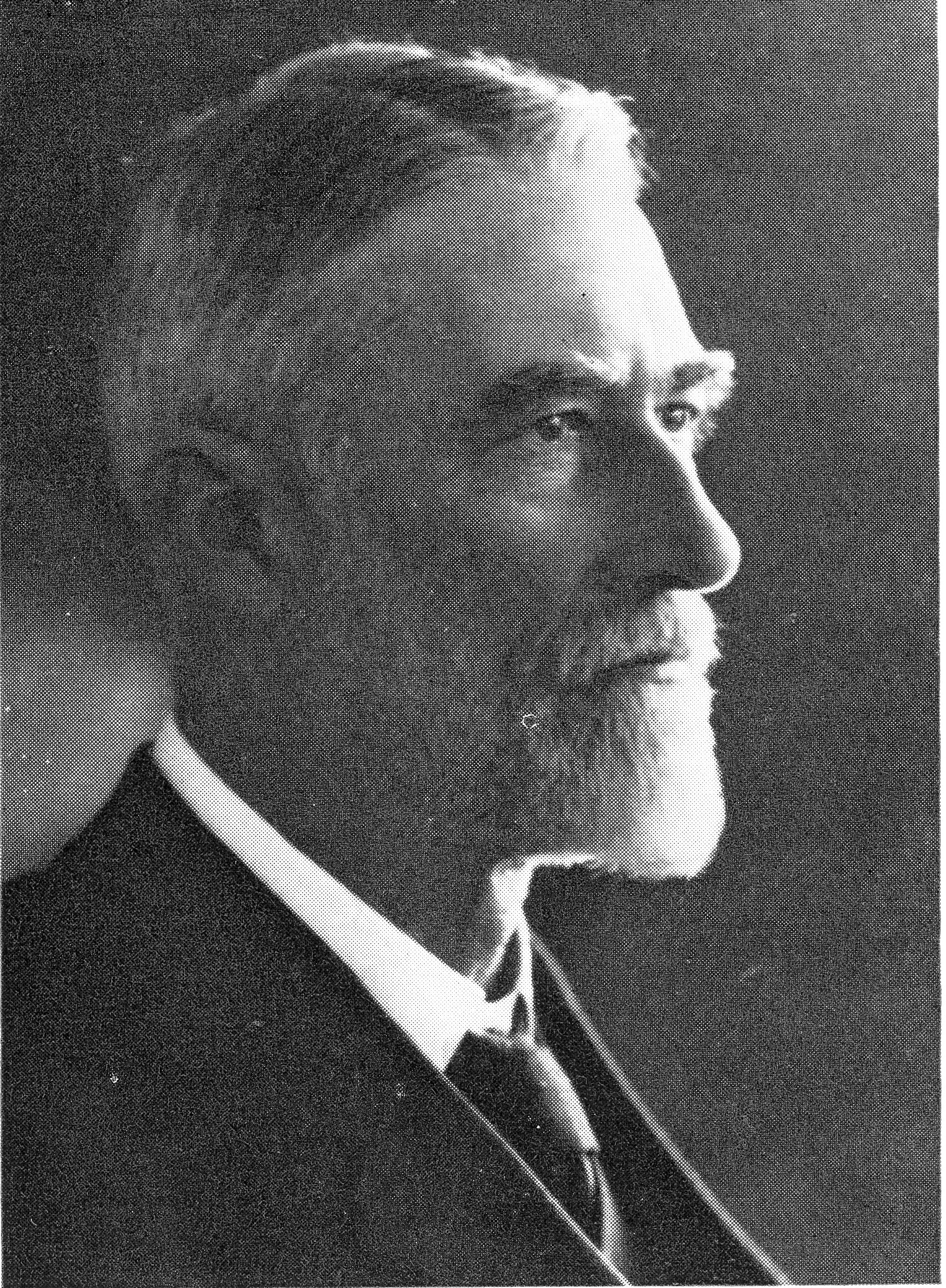
H.M. Beatty

The 33 locomotives in this fourth group of the CGR 6th Class were built in 1898 by Neilson, Reid and Company. Of these engines, 26 went to the CGR's Western System, numbered in the range from 234 to 259, three to the Midland System, numbered 585, 586 and 594, and four to the Eastern System, numbered in the range from 665 to 668.

These locomotives represented a further advance on earlier 6th Class locomotives, with a greater heating surface and a larger firegrate area. They did, however, revert to the same Type YC six-wheeled tenders which were earlier used with the second group of 6th Class locomotives, later the Class 6A.

== Class 6 sub-classes ==
When the Union of South Africa was established on 31 May 1910, the three Colonial government railways (CGR, Natal Government Railways and Central South African Railways) were united under a single administration to control and administer the railways, ports and harbours of the Union. Although the South African Railways and Harbours came into existence in 1910, the actual classification and renumbering of all the rolling stock of the three constituent railways were only implemented with effect from 1 January 1912.

When these locomotives were assimilated into the South African Railways (SAR) in 1912, they were renumbered in the range from 565 to 597 and designated Class 6D. The rest of the CGR's 6th Class locomotives, together with the Class 6-L1 to 6L3 locomotives which had been inherited by the Central South African Railways from the Oranje-Vrijstaat Gouwerment-Spoorwegen via the Imperial Military Railways, were grouped into thirteen more sub-classes by the SAR. The 4-6-0 locomotives became SAR Classes 6, 6A to 6C, 6E to 6H and 6J to 6L, the 2-6-2 locomotives became Class 6Y and the 2-6-4 locomotives became Class 6Z.

== Service ==
=== South Africa ===
The Class 6 series of locomotives were introduced primarily as passenger locomotives, but when the class became displaced by larger and more powerful locomotive classes, it literally became a Jack-of-all-trades which proved itself as one of the most useful and successful locomotive classes ever to be designed at the Salt River shops. It went on to see service in all parts of the country, except Natal, and was used on all types of traffic.

After the Simon's Town line in Cape Town was electrified in 1928, Class 6D engines that used to haul commuters on this line became dock shunting engines in Table Bay Harbour. This continued until they were gradually replaced by new Class S2 0-8-0 shunting engines from 1952.

=== Sudan ===
During the Second World War, sixteen locomotives of the Classes 6 to 6D were transferred to the Middle East to assist with the war effort during the North African Campaign. The two Class 6D locomotives in this group were numbers 572 and 587. They did not return to South Africa after the war and were sold to the Sudan Railways Corporation in 1942. Sudan Railways renumbered them M714 and M715, in the same order as their former SAR engine numbers.

== Renumbering ==
The Class 6D works numbers, system allocation and renumbering are listed in the table.

Class 6D 4-6-0 Works numbers and renumbering
Works no.	CGR no.	CGR system	SAR no.	Sudan no.
5240	234	Western	565	
5241	235	Western	566	
5242	236	Western	567	
5245	237	Western	568	
5246	238	Western	569	
5247	239	Western	570	
5249	240	Western	571	
5250	241	Western	572	M714
5251	242	Western	573	
5252	243	Western	574	
5257	244	Western	575	
5258	245	Western	576	
5259	246	Western	577	
5260	247	Western	578	
5261	248	Western	579	
5262	249	Western	580	
5263	250	Western	581	
5264	251	Western	582	
5265	252	Western	583	
5266	253	Western	584	
5267	254	Western	585	
5268	255	Western	586	
5269	256	Western	587	M715
5270	257	Western	588	
5271	258	Western	589	
5272	259	Western	590	
5248	585	Midland	591	
5253	586	Midland	592	
5255	594	Midland	593	
5243	665	Eastern	594	
5244	666	Eastern	595	
5254	667	Eastern	596	
5256	668	Eastern	597	

== Preservation ==
Only one of these locomotives survives. No. 579 is plinthed at King William's Town Station Forecourt.
