= South African Class 5B 4-6-2 =

1904 design of steam locomotive

CGR Karoo Class 4-6-2 1904 South African Class 5B & 5BR 4-6-2
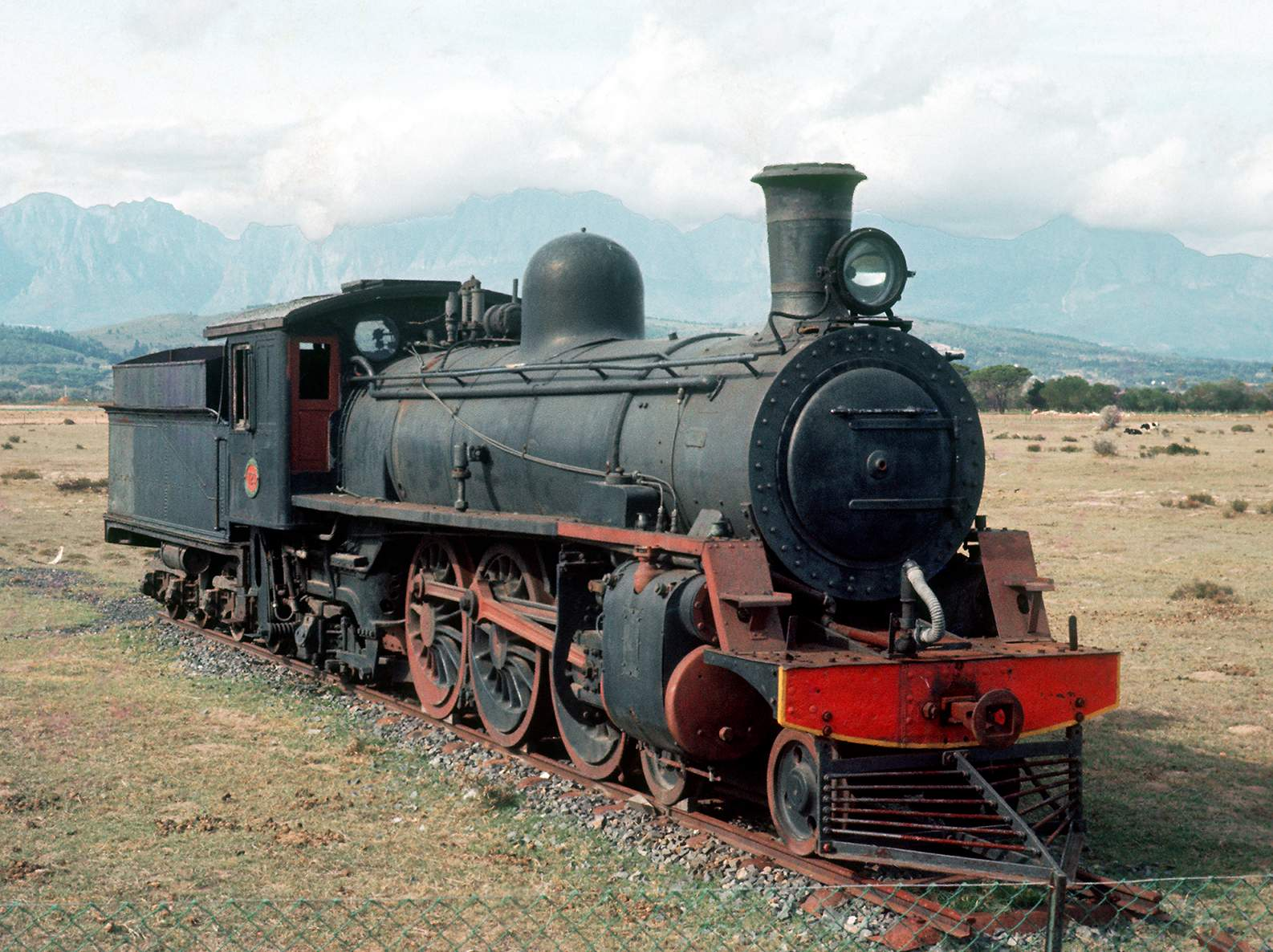
- No. 723 plinthed at Strand, 12 April 1970
Type and origin
- ♠ Class 5B as built with a round-topped firebox ♥ Class 5BR rebuilt with a Watson Standard boiler
- Power type: Steam
- Designer: Cape Government Railways (Hazlitt Beatty)
- Builder: Beyer, Peacock & Company
- Order number: 9124
- Serial number: 4567–4570
- Model: CGR Karoo
- Build date: 1904
- Total produced: 4
- Rebuilder: South African Railways
- Rebuild date: 1930s
- Number rebuilt: 1 to Class 5BR
Specifications
- Configuration
  - Whyte: 4-6-2
- Driver: 2nd coupled axle
- Gauge: 3 ft 6 in (1,067 mm) Cape gauge
- Leading dia.: 28 1/2 in (724 mm)
- Coupled dia.: 60 in (1,524 mm)
- Trailing dia.: 33 in (838 mm)
- Tender wheels: 37 in (940 mm)
- Wheelbase: 48 ft 10 5/8 in (14,900 mm)
  - Axle spacing (Asymmetrical): 1-2: 5 ft 2 in (1,575 mm); 2-3: 5 ft 3 in (1,600 mm)
  - Engine: 28 ft 3 in (8,611 mm)
  - Leading: 5 ft 9 in (1,753 mm)
  - Coupled: 10 ft 5 in (3,175 mm)
  - Tender: 10 ft 6 in (3,200 mm)
- Length
  - Over couplers: 57 ft 7 3/4 in (17,570 mm) (Bell) ♥ 59 ft (17,983 mm) (AAR knuckle)
- Height: ♠ 12 ft 10 in (3,912 mm) ♥ 12 ft 11 in (3,937 mm)
- Frame type: Bar
- Axle load: ♠ 14 LT 7 cwt (14,580 kg) ♥ 14 LT 12 cwt (14,830 kg)
  - Leading: ♠ 10 LT 16 cwt (10,970 kg) ♥ 14 LT 8 cwt (14,630 kg)
  - 1st coupled: ♠ 12 LT 13 cwt (12,850 kg) ♥ 14 LT 7 cwt (14,580 kg)
  - 2nd coupled: ♠ 13 LT 16 cwt (14,020 kg) ♥ 14 LT 12 cwt (14,830 kg)
  - 3rd coupled: ♠ 14 LT 7 cwt (14,580 kg) ♥ 14 LT 9 cwt (14,680 kg)
  - Trailing: ♠ 10 LT 6 cwt (10,470 kg) ♥ 12 LT 3 cwt (12,340 kg)
  - Tender axle: 11 LT 6 cwt 3 qtr (11,520 kg) av.
- Adhesive weight: ♠ 40 LT 16 cwt (41,450 kg) ♥ 43 LT 8 cwt (44,100 kg)
- Loco weight: ♠ 61 LT 18 cwt (62,890 kg) ♥ 68 LT 19 cwt (70,060 kg)
- Tender weight: 34 LT (34,550 kg)
- Total weight: ♠ 95 LT 18 cwt (97,440 kg) ♥ 102 LT 19 cwt (104,600 kg)
- Tender type: YE1 (3-axle); YB, YC, YE, YE1 permitted
- Fuel type: Coal
- Fuel capacity: 6 LT (6.1 t)
- Water cap.: 2,825 imp gal (12,800 L)
- Firebox
  - Type: Round-top (copper or steel)
  - Grate area: ♠ 26.5 sq ft (2.46 m^{2}) ♥ 36 sq ft (3.3 m^{2})
- Boiler
  - Model: ♥ Watson Standard no. 1
  - Pitch: ♠ 7 ft 1 in (2,159 mm) ♥ 8 ft (2,438 mm)
  - Diameter: ♠ 4 ft 9 in (1,448 mm) ♥ 5 ft (1,524 mm)
  - Tube plates: ♠ 15 ft (4,572 mm) ♥ 17 ft 9 in (5,410 mm) steel f/b ♥ 17 ft 8 5/8 in (5,401 mm) copper
  - Small tubes: ♠ 181: 2 in (51 mm) ♠ 77: 2 in (51 mm) modified 5B ♥ 76: 2 1/2 in (64 mm)
  - Large tubes: ♠ 16: 5 1/2 in (140 mm) modified 5B ♥ 24: 5 1/2 in (140 mm)
- Boiler pressure: ♠♥ 180 psi (1,241 kPa)
- Safety valve: ♠ Coale (723 & 724) ♠ Ramsbottom (725 & 726) ♥ Pop
- Heating surface
  - Firebox: ♠ 107 sq ft (9.9 m^{2}) ♥ 123 sq ft (11.4 m^{2})
  - Tubes: ♠ 1,421.5 sq ft (132.06 m^{2}) ♥ 1,497 sq ft (139.1 m^{2})
  - Total surface: ♠ 1,528.5 sq ft (142.00 m^{2}) ♥ 1,620 sq ft (151 m^{2})
- Superheater
  - Heating area: ♠ 324 sq ft (30.1 m^{2}) modified 5B ♥ 366 sq ft (34.0 m^{2})
- Cylinders: Two
- Cylinder size: 18 1/2 in (470 mm) bore 26 in (660 mm) stroke
- Valve gear: Stephenson
- Valve type: Slide (as built), Piston (modified)
- Couplers: Johnston link-and-pin AAR knuckle (1930s)
Performance figures
- Tractive effort: ♠ 20,030 lbf (89.1 kN) @ 75% ♥ 22,240 lbf (98.9 kN) @ 75%
Career
- Operators: Cape Government Railways; South African Railways
- Class: CGR Karoo Class; SAR Class 5B & 5BR
- Number in class: 4
- Numbers: CGR 905-908; SAR 723-726
- Delivered: 1904
- First run: 1904
- Withdrawn: 1969
- The centre coupled axle had flangeless wheels

The South African Railways Class 5B 4-6-2 of 1904 was a steam locomotive from the pre-Union era in the Cape of Good Hope.

In 1904, the Cape Government Railways placed four Karoo Class 4-6-2 steam locomotives in service. In 1912, when they were assimilated into the South African Railways, they were renumbered and classified as Class 5B.

== Manufacturer ==
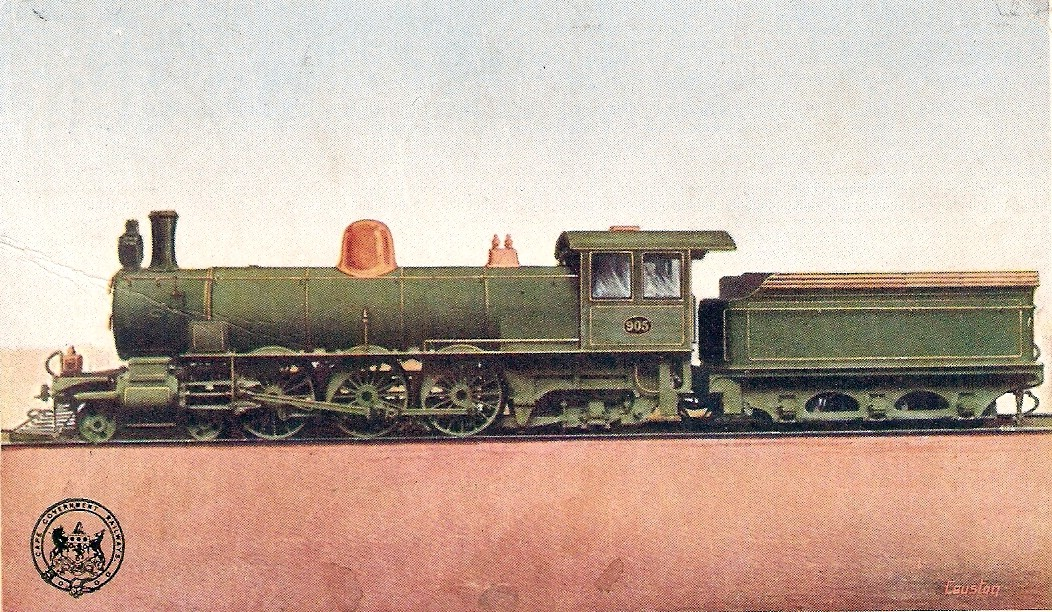
CGR Karoo Class no. 905, SAR Class 5B no. 723, with Type YE1 tender

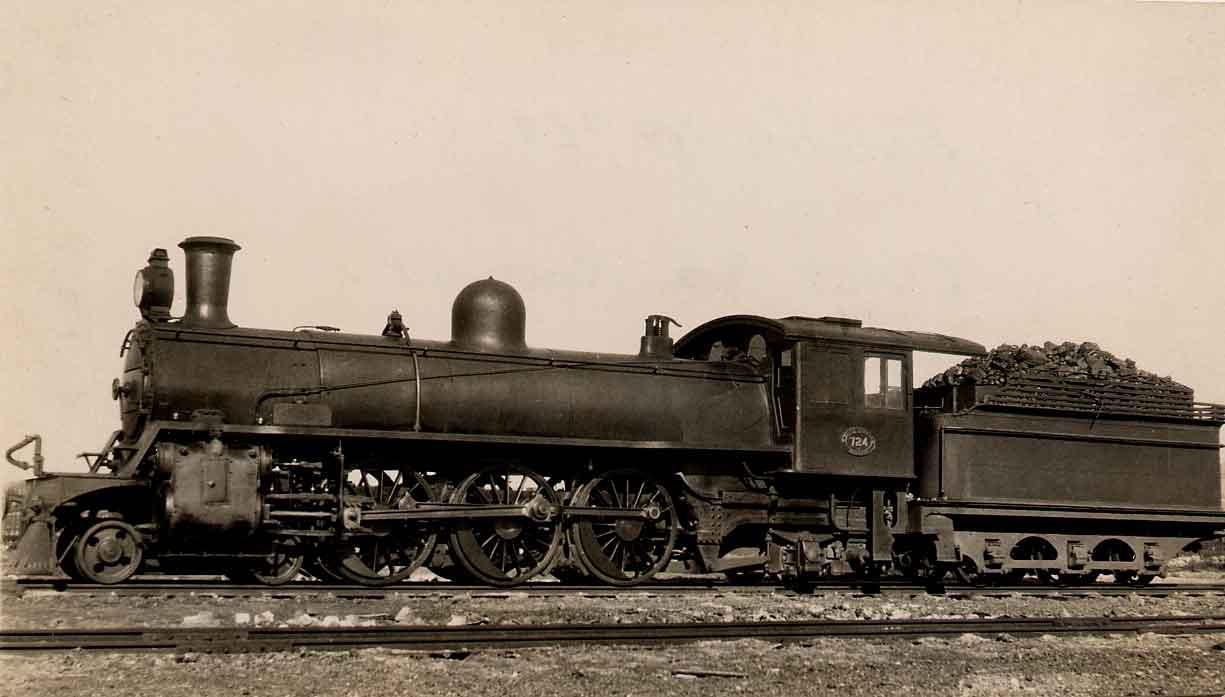
Superheated Class 5B no. 724, ex CGR Karoo Class no. 906, with modified Type YC tender, c. 1930

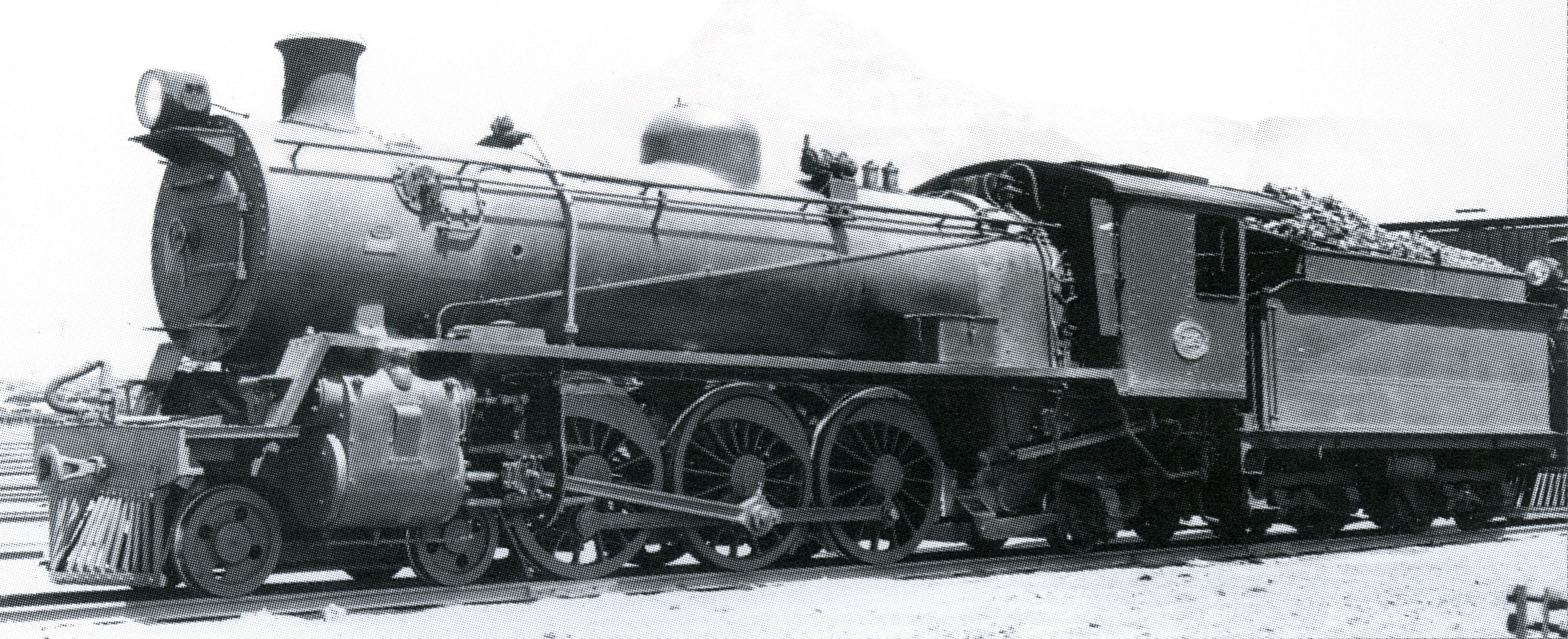
Class 5BR no. 725, reboilered with a Watson Standard no. 1 boiler, c. 1940

Following on the success of the first two Karoo Class locomotives of the Cape Government Railways (CGR), a further four were ordered from Beyer, Peacock & Company in 1904 and delivered in that same year. In view of the experience gained with the original two Karoo Class locomotives, their design was modified slightly by CGR Chief Locomotive Superintendent Hazlitt Beatty.

They were numbered in the range from 905 to 908 and, like the previous two locomotives, they were also not allocated class numbers by the CGR. Instead, they were also known as the Karoo Class, from the region of the Western System where they were designed to work.

The type YE1 tender was introduced along with these locomotives. It rode on three axles and had a capacity of 6 long tons (6.1 tonnes) coal and 2,825 imperial gallons (12,800 litres) water.

== Characteristics ==
With these locomotives, Hazlitt Beatty allowed a 1/2 inch (13 millimetres) increase in the boiler pitch compared to that of the first two Karoo Class engines, to 7 feet 1 inch (2,159 millimetres) above the railhead.

This increase still did not allow sufficient clearance between the boiler barrel and the 60 inches (1,524 millimetres) diameter coupled wheels. Pockets in the boiler barrel, similar to those used on the earlier locomotives, were therefore still necessary. The boilers of the first two locomotives, numbers 905 and 906, were fitted with Coale patent safety valves, while numbers 907 and 908 had Ramsbottom safety valves. The eccentrics and motion were actuated from the driving (centre) axle instead of the trailing axle. The firebox had an inside width of 4 feet 2 1/2 inches (1,283 millimetres).

== South African Railways ==
When the Union of South Africa was established on 31 May 1910, the three Colonial government railways (CGR, Natal Government Railways and Central South African Railways) were united under a single administration to control and administer the railways, ports and harbours of the Union. Although the South African Railways and Harbours came into existence in 1910, the actual classification and renumbering of all the rolling stock of the three constituent railways were only implemented with effect from 1 January 1912.

In 1912, these four locomotives were renumbered in the range from 723 to 726 and designated Class 5B on the South African Railways (SAR).

== Modifications ==
=== Piston valves and smokebox ===
In the early 1930s, A.G. Watson, CME of the SAR at the time, endeavoured to improve some of the older locomotive classes in various ways. The Class 5B were fitted with superheating, piston valves and a redesigned smokebox arrangement which resulted in an exhaust which has been described as "positively startling" when the regulator was opened up. At the same time, their running boards were raised clear of the coupled wheels. This modification made the as-built wheel fairings on the running boards unnecessary and resulted in a locomotive with a North American rather than a British appearance.

=== Trofimoff piston valves ===
During September 1931, Watson fitted engine no. 726 with Trofimoff type by-pass piston valves as an experiment. The Trofimoff valve was claimed to afford ideal conditions when drifting. On no. 726, the experiment was less than successful and, after having the covers blown off a couple of times through too sudden opening of the regulator, the Trofimoff piston valves were removed.

The Trofimoff piston valve consisted of two fixed discs secured to the valve spindle, and two junk rings, each carrying a bull ring and four valve rings and both free to move longitudinally on the spindle. When the regulator is opened, steam forces the loose valve bodies against their respective fixed discs and they then act as units, similar to ordinary piston valves. When steam is shut off, the loose valve heads become detached from their respective discs and remain in their idle positions near the centre of the steam chest, while the valve spindle and fixed disks continue their reciprocating motion with the spindle sliding freely through the now stationary loose valve heads, and with the steam and exhaust ports now in communication. With both ends of the cylinders now in communication, the use of ordinary by-bass or snifting valves became unnecessary.

The first such experiment was carried out on Class 16C no. 851. Further similar experiments were carried out on Class 16B no. 805 in July 1932, Class 16DA no. 876 in August 1932, Class 15CA no. 2852 in March 1933 and finally on Class 15A no. 1961. The results of these extended tests did not prove entirely satisfactory and all these engines were gradually refitted with standard piston valves and snifting valves.

=== Experimental chimney ===
The same locomotive, no. 726, was also fitted with an experimental chimney designed by Watson. A similar chimney, the shape of which earned it a nickname that referred to a night bucket, was also tested on Class 8D no. 1197. This experiment did not result in further production.

=== Split crossheads ===
In another experiment, one of the class was fitted with split crossheads. The split was on the vertical centre line and the two halves were bolted together over the end of the piston rod. The end of the piston rod and its nesting inside the crosshead halves were grooved in an arrangement similar to a nut and bolt, but with parallel grooves. The experiment was not a success, since the rods managed to work themselves loose. One of the front cylinder covers was blown off along with parts of the cylinder itself and the idea was abandoned.

=== Watson Standard boilers ===
In the 1930s, many serving locomotives were reboilered with a standard boiler type, designed by Watson as part of his standardisation policy. Such Watson Standard reboilered locomotives were reclassified by adding an "R" suffix to their classification.

Only one of the Class 5B locomotives, no. 725, was eventually reboilered with a Watson Standard no. 1 boiler and reclassified to Class 5BR. While the original boiler was fitted with Ramsbottom safety valves, the Watson Standard boiler was fitted with Pop safety valves.

The reboilering required extensive modifications to the frame under the firebox. The Beatty-designed bridle casting was removed and the bar frames extended backwards under the firebox to the rear drag box. This frame modification turned out to be a weak point in the more powerful rebuilt engine, with the result that she was never again favoured for road work and spent most of her later service life more or less permanently confined to the Culemborg carriage yard.

== Service ==
In service, the Class 5B locomotives performed excellently. Beatty's annual report for 1905 stated that they collectively ran 171,000 miles (275,000 kilometres) without a failure of any description, while their consumption of mixed imported and Colonial coal was 52 pounds (24 kilograms) per train-mile.

They spent a large part of their working lives in the Karoo, working between Beaufort West and De Aar, until they were displaced by larger locomotives and assigned to the Paardeneiland shed in Cape Town. Some remained in service around Cape Town for many years and became familiar sights on the Strand and Stellenbosch suburban trains, until the last locomotive of this Class was withdrawn by 1969.

Upon withdrawal, no. 723 was plinthed at Strand station. It was subsequently moved to De Aar, where it was observed in April 1980 as part of the well-known and well-maintained collection of preserved locomotives. No. 723, as well as most of the other locomotives in the De Aar collection, were subsequently relocated to Millsite near Krugersdorp.

== Preservation ==
One survived into preservation, 723 that is owned by the Transnet Heritage Foundation.
