= South African Class 6C 4-6-0 =

1895 design of steam locomotive

OVGS 6th Class L2 4-6-0 CSAR Class 6-L2 4-6-0 South African Class 6C 4-6-0
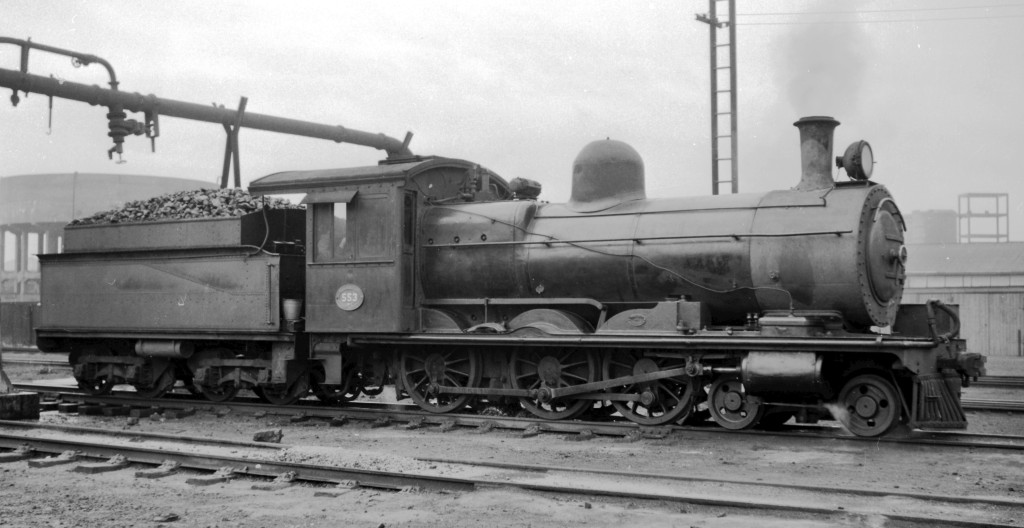
- OVGS 6th Class L2 no. 88, CSAR Class 6-L2 no. 364, SAR Class 6C no. 553, with a Belpaire firebox and bogie tender
Type and origin
- ♠ – Original locomotive, as built ♥ – Locomotive rebuilt with Belpaire firebox
- Power type: Steam
- Designer: Cape Government Railways (H.M. Beatty)
- Builder: Dübs and Company; Sharp, Stewart and Company; Neilson and Company
- Serial number: Dübs: 3331, 3336, 3343-3344, 3440, 3448, 3457-3459; Sharps: 4120-4121, 4140-4143; Neilson: 5126-5127, 5130, 5182-5187
- Model: CGR 6th Class
- Build date: 1895–1898
- Total produced: 24
Specifications
- Configuration
  - Whyte: 4-6-0 (Tenwheeler)
  - UIC: 2'Cn2
- Driver: 2nd coupled axle
- Gauge: 3 ft 6 in (1,067 mm) Cape gauge
- Leading dia.: 28 1/2 in (724 mm)
- Coupled dia.: 54 in (1,372 mm)
- Tender wheels: 37 in (940 mm)
- Wheelbase: 42 ft 5/8 in (12,817 mm)
  - Axle spacing (Asymmetrical): 1-2: 4 ft 9 in (1,448 mm); 2-3: 6 ft 3 in (1,905 mm)
  - Engine: 20 ft 3 3/4 in (6,191 mm)
  - Leading: 5 ft 5 1/2 in (1,664 mm)
  - Coupled: 11 ft (3,353 mm)
  - Tender: 10 ft (3,048 mm)
- Length
  - Over couplers: 51 ft 7 1/4 in (15,729 mm)
- Height: ♠ 12 ft 10 in (3,912 mm) ♥ 12 ft 10 3/8 in (3,921 mm)
- Frame type: Plate
- Axle load: ♠ 11 LT 17 cwt (12,040 kg)
  - Leading: ♠ 11 LT 8 cwt (11,580 kg) ♥ 10 LT 17 cwt 2 qtr (11,050 kg)
  - Coupled: ♥ 13 LT 8 cwt (13,620 kg)
  - 1st coupled: ♠ 11 LT 15 cwt (11,940 kg)
  - 2nd coupled: ♠ 11 LT 17 cwt (12,040 kg)
  - 3rd coupled: ♠ 11 LT 15 cwt 2 qtr (11,960 kg)
  - Tender axle: 10 LT 8 cwt (10,570 kg) average
- Adhesive weight: ♠ 35 LT 7 cwt 2 qtr (35,940 kg) ♥ 40 LT 4 cwt (40,850 kg)
- Loco weight: ♠ 46 LT 15 cwt 2 qtr (47,530 kg) ♥ 51 LT 1 cwt 2 qtr (51,890 kg)
- Tender weight: 31 LT 4 cwt (31,700 kg)
- Total weight: ♠ 77 LT 19 cwt 2 qtr (79,230 kg) ♥ 82 LT 5 cwt 2 qtr (83,600 kg)
- Tender type: YC (3-axle); YB, YC, YE, YE1 permitted
- Fuel type: Coal
- Fuel capacity: 5 LT 10 cwt (5.6 t)
- Water cap.: 2,590 imp gal (11,770 L)
- Firebox
  - Type: ♠ Round-top – ♥ Belpaire
  - Grate area: ♠♥ 16.6 sq ft (1.54 m^{2})
- Boiler
  - Pitch: ♠ 6 ft 8 in (2,032 mm) ♥ 7 ft (2,134 mm)
  - Diameter: ♠ 4 ft 4 in (1,321 mm) ♥ 4 ft 9 in (1,448 mm)
  - Tube plates: ♠♥ 11 ft 2 1/8 in (3,407 mm)
  - Small tubes: ♠ 185: 1 7/8 in (48 mm) ♥ 220: 2 in (51 mm)
- Boiler pressure: ♠ 160 psi (1,103 kPa) ♥ 180 psi (1,241 kPa)
- Safety valve: Ramsbottom
- Heating surface
  - Firebox: ♠ 101 sq ft (9.4 m^{2}) ♥ 111 sq ft (10.3 m^{2})
  - Tubes: ♠ 1,015 sq ft (94.3 m^{2}) ♥ 1,287.5 sq ft (119.61 m^{2})
  - Total surface: ♠ 1,116 sq ft (103.7 m^{2}) ♥ 1,398.5 sq ft (129.92 m^{2})
- Cylinders: Two
- Cylinder size: 17 in (432 mm) bore 26 in (660 mm) stroke
- Valve gear: Stephenson
- Couplers: Johnston link-and-pin AAR knuckle (1930s)
Performance figures
- Tractive effort: ♠ 16,690 lbf (74.2 kN) @ 75% ♥ 18,780 lbf (83.5 kN) @ 75%
Career
- Operators: OVGS; Imperial Military Railways; Central South African Railways; South African Railways; Sudan Railways
- Class: OVGS 6th Class L2; CSAR Class 6-L2; SAR Class 6C
- Number in class: 24
- Numbers: OVGS 70-93; CSAR 346-369; SAR 541-559, 561-564; Sudan M713
- Delivered: 1895–1898
- First run: 1896
- Withdrawn: 1973

The South African Railways Class 6C 4-6-0 of 1896 was a steam locomotive from the pre-Union era in the Orange Free State.

Between 1895 and 1898, the Oranje-Vrijstaat Gouwerment-Spoorwegen placed 24 new Cape 6th Class steam locomotives with a 4-6-0 Tenwheeler type wheel arrangement in service, designated 6th Class L2. When British forces invaded the Orange Free State during the Second Boer War, these locomotives were taken over by the Imperial Military Railways. After the war, they were renumbered onto the Central South African Railways roster and designated Class 6-L2. In 1912, when the remaining 23 locomotives were assimilated into the South African Railways, they were renumbered again and designated Class 6C.

== Manufacturers ==
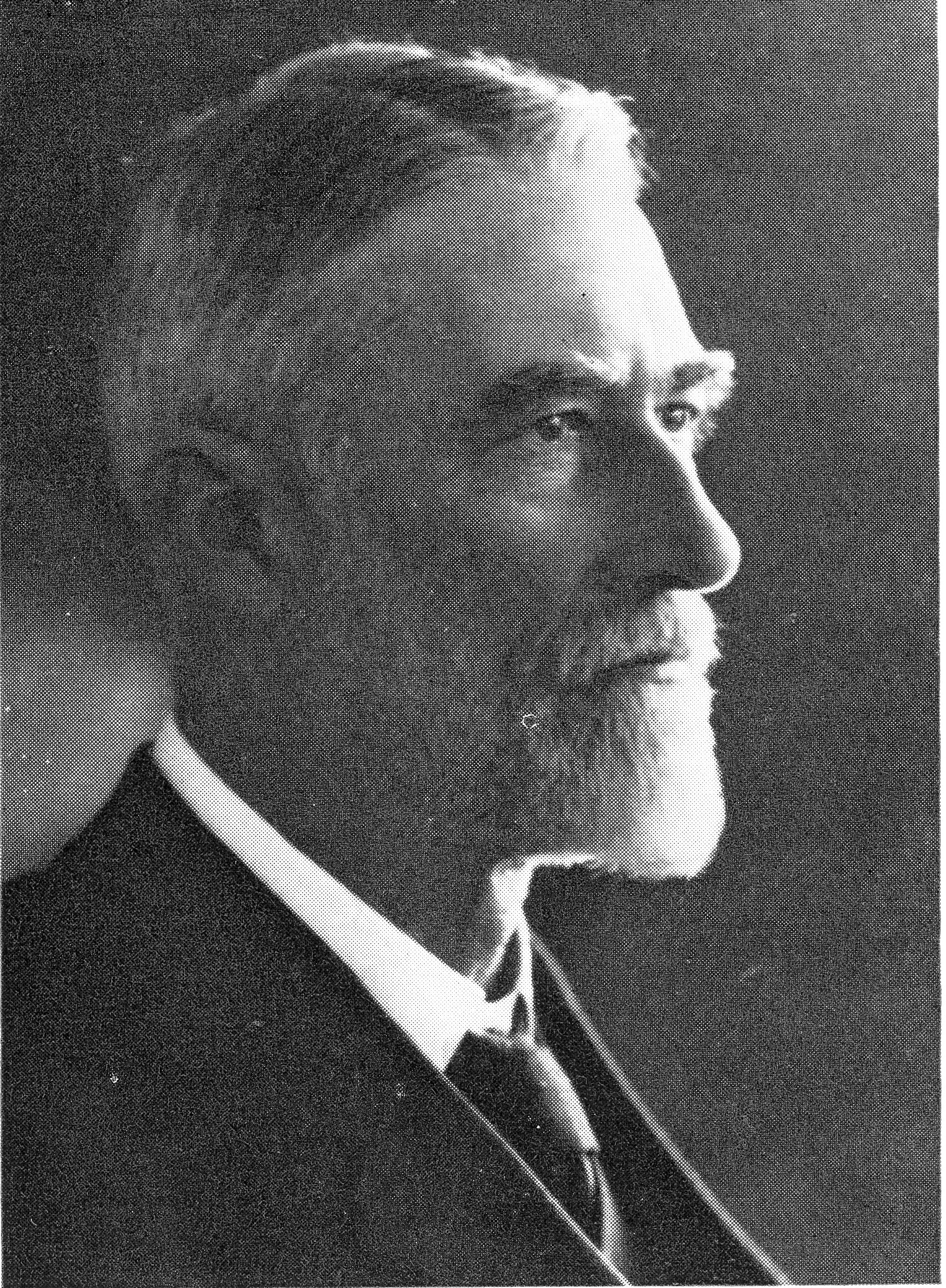
H.M. Beatty

The original Cape 6th Class locomotive had been designed in 1892 by H.M. Beatty, at the time the Locomotive Superintendent of the Western System of the Cape Government Railways (CGR).

The first 6th Class locomotives of the Oranje-Vrijstaat Gouwerment-Spoorwegen (OVGS) were purchased second-hand from the CGR and designated 6th Class L. These ten engines were soon followed by orders for new 6th Class locomotives directly from the manufacturers.

The 24 locomotives in the first group to be built new for the OVGS were manufactured between 1895 and 1898 by Sharp, Stewart and Company, Dübs and Company and Neilson and Company. They were designated 6th Class L2 when they were delivered between 1896 and 1898. Six of these locomotives were built by Sharp, Stewart, numbered in the range from 70 to 75, nine by Dübs, numbered in the range from 76 to 84, and nine by Neilson, numbered in the range from 85 to 93. All these locomotives were delivered with Type YC six-wheeled tenders.

== Service ==
=== South Africa ===
When British forces invaded the Orange Free State during the Second Boer War, all these OVGS locomotives were taken over by the Imperial Military Railways (IMR), but not renumbered. They were only renumbered after the war, when they were included in the Central South African Railways (CSAR) roster in 1902 and designated CSAR Class 6-L2.

P.A. Hyde, the Chief Locomotive Superintendent of the CSAR from 1902 to 1904, considered the 6th Class as about the best design for their weight ever made. Several of the CSAR's Class 6-L1 to 6-L3 locomotives, including ten of these ex-OVGS locomotives, were modified by Hyde by having their round-topped fireboxes replaced with larger boilers and Belpaire fireboxes and by having larger, more sheltered cabs installed. This conversion improved their performance tremendously, to the extent that they could be used in place of the 8th Class where they were formerly outclassed by load. This represented an increase in hauling capacity of some 12% while their coal consumption was reduced by some 5%. The ten locomotives which were later renumbered in the ranges from 554 to 559 and 561 to 564 on the South African Railways (SAR), had undergone this modification.

After the Simon's Town line in Cape Town was electrified in 1928, Class 6C engines that used to haul commuters on this line became dock shunting engines in Table Bay Harbour. This continued until they were gradually replaced by new Class S2 0-8-0 shunting engines from 1952.

During the 1930s, many of them were modified once again, when the Chief Mechanical Engineer of the SAR at the time, A.G. Watson, embarked on his program of standardisation and reboilered them with round-topped fireboxes once again. They retained the larger Hyde-designed cabs, however, and were not reclassified.

=== Sudan ===
During the Second World War, sixteen of the Classes 6 to 6D were transferred to the Middle East to assist with the war effort during the North African Campaign. The sole Class 6C locomotive in this group was no. 548. It was sold to the Sudan Railways Corporation in 1942 and renumbered M713.

== Class 6 sub-classes ==
When the Union of South Africa was established on 31 May 1910, the three Colonial government railways (CGR, Natal Government Railways and CSAR) were united under a single administration to control and administer the railways, ports and harbours of the Union. Although the South African Railways and Harbours came into existence in 1910, the actual classification and renumbering of all the rolling stock of the three constituent railways were only implemented with effect from 1 January 1912.

When all but one of these 24 locomotives were assimilated into the SAR in 1912, they were designated Class 6C and renumbered in the ranges from 541 to 559 and 561 to 564. The fate of the one locomotive which did not enter SAR service, OVGS no. 89, later CSAR no. 365, is not known, although SAR no. 560 appears to have been reserved for it.

These locomotives, together with the CGR's 6th Class locomotives and the CSAR Classes 6-L1 and 6-L3 locomotives which had been inherited from the OVGS via the IMR, were grouped into altogether fourteen sub-classes by the SAR. The 4-6-0 locomotives became SAR Classes 6, 6A, 6B, 6D to 6H and 6J to 6L, the 2-6-2 locomotives became Class 6Y and the 2-6-4 locomotives became Class 6Z.

== Renumbering ==
The Class 6C locomotives were renumbered twice, first from the OVGS onto the CSAR roster and again in 1912 onto the SAR roster. The table lists their renumbering as well as their builder's and works numbers.

Class 6C 4-6-0 Builders, works numbers and renumbering
Builder	Year built	Works no.	OVGS no.	CSAR no.	SAR no.	Sudan no.
Sharp, Stewart	1896	4120	70	346	541	
Sharp, Stewart	1896	4121	71	347	542	
Sharp, Stewart	1896	4140	72	348	543	
Sharp, Stewart	1896	4141	73	349	544	
Sharp, Stewart	1896	4142	74	350	554	
Sharp, Stewart	1896	4143	75	351	545	
Dübs	1895	3331	76	352	546	
Dübs	1895	3336	77	353	547	
Dübs	1895	3343	78	354	548	M713
Dübs	1895	3344	79	355	555	
Dübs	1897	3440	80	356	556	
Dübs	1897	3448	81	357	557	
Dübs	1897	3457	82	358	549	
Dübs	1897	3459	83	359	558	
Dübs	1897	3458	84	360	550	
Neilson	1897	5126	85	361	551	
Neilson	1897	5127	86	362	552	
Neilson	1897	5130	87	363	559	
Neilson	1898	5182	88	364	553	
Neilson	1898	5183	89	365		
Neilson	1898	5184	90	366	561	
Neilson	1898	5185	91	367	562	
Neilson	1898	5186	92	368	563	
Neilson	1898	5187	93	369	564	

== Preservation ==
Only one locomotive of this class survives. No. 544 is preserved by the Sandstone Heritage Trust at Sandstone Estates and is on display.

== Illustration ==
The main picture shows SAR Class 6C no. 553, with a Belpaire firebox, while the following shows CSAR Class 6-L2 no. 349, with its as-delivered round-topped firebox and small cab, as depicted on a SAR Museum playing card.

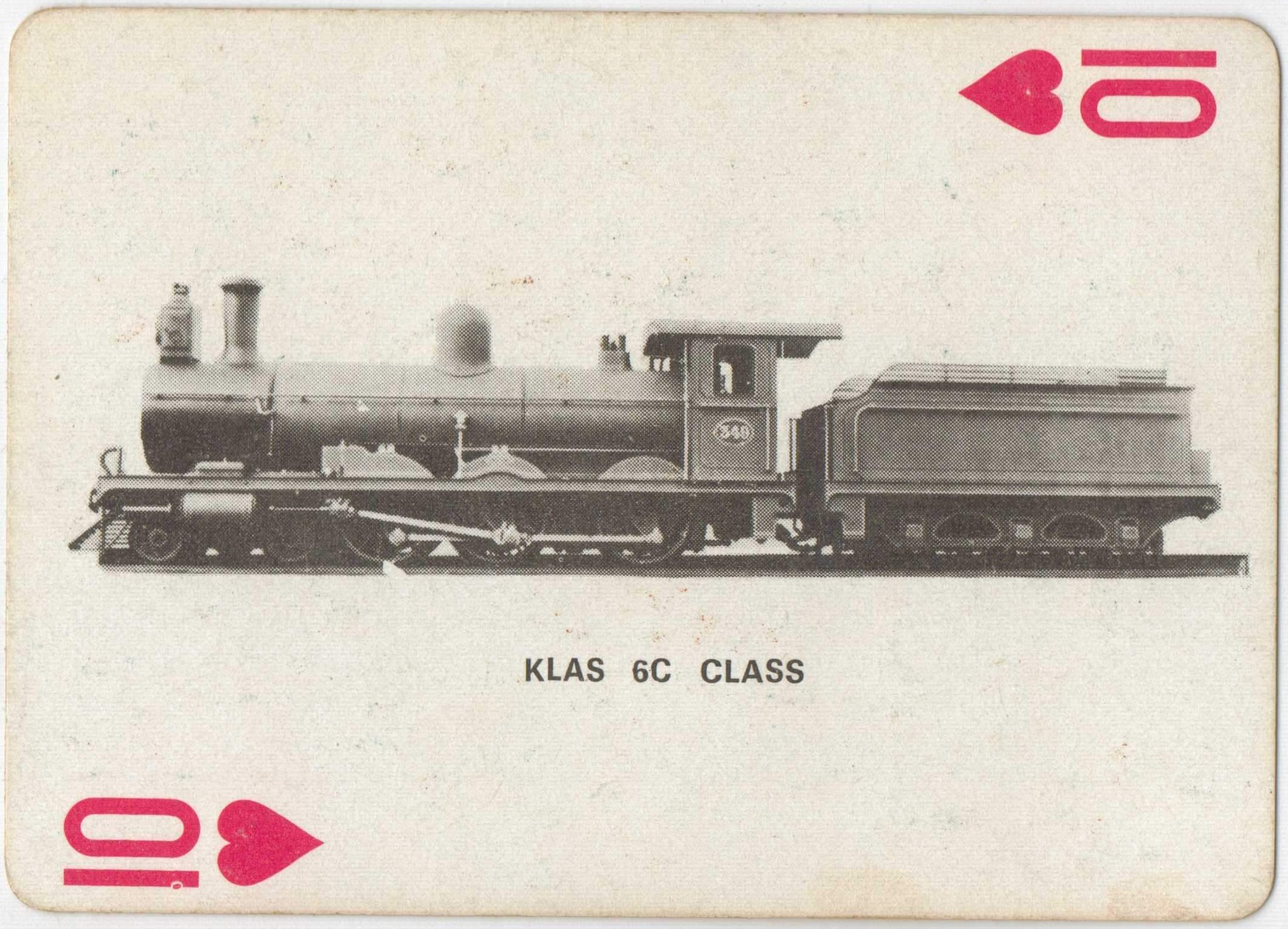
OVGS 6th Class L2 no. 73, CSAR Class 6-L2 no. 349, SAR Class 6C no. 544, with a Type YC tender
