= South African type YC tender =

Steam locomotive tender

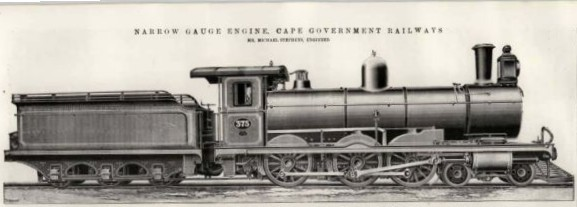
- Type YC tender on CGR 6th Class of 1896
Type and origin
- ♠ Tender as built - ♥ Modified tender
- Locomotive: CGR 6th Class of 1896; CGR 6th Class of 1898; OVGS 6th Class L2
- Designer: Cape Government Railways (H.M. Beatty)
- Builder: Dübs and Company; Neilson and Company; Neilson, Reid and Company; Sharp, Stewart and Company
- In service: 1896-1898
Specifications
- Configuration: 3-axle
- Gauge: 3 ft 6 in (1,067 mm) Cape gauge
- Length: 21 ft 2 7/8 in (6,474 mm)
- Wheel dia.: 37 in (940 mm)
- Wheelbase: 10 ft (3,048 mm)
- Axle load: ♠ 10 LT 8 cwt (10,570 kg) average ♥ 11 LT 1 cwt 2 qtr (11,250 kg) av.
- Weight empty: ♠ 33,056 lb (14,994 kg)
- Weight w/o: ♠ 31 LT 4 cwt (31,700 kg) ♥ 33 LT 4 cwt (33,730 kg)
- Fuel type: Coal
- Fuel cap.: ♠ 5 LT 10 cwt (5.6 t) ♥ 7 LT 10 cwt (7.6 t)
- Water cap.: ♠ 2,590 imp gal (11,770 L) ♥ 2,600 imp gal (11,820 L)
- Stoking: Manual
- Couplers: Drawbar & Johnston link-and-pin Drawbar & AAR knuckle (1930s)
Career
- Operators: Cape Government Railways; OVGS
- Numbers: SAR 441-489, 541-559, 561-597

The South African type YC tender was a steam locomotive tender from the pre-Union era in the Cape of Good Hope.

The Type YC tender first entered service in 1896, as tenders to the second version of the 6th Class 4-6-0 Tenwheeler type steam locomotives to be acquired by the Cape Government Railways. These locomotives were designated Class 6A on the South African Railways in 1912.

== Manufacturers ==
Type YC tenders were built between 1896 and 1898 by Dübs and Company, Neilson and Company, Neilson, Reid and Company and Sharp, Stewart and Company.

The original 6th Class locomotive and tender had been designed at the Salt River works in Cape Town in 1892, under the supervision of Western System Locomotive Superintendent H.M. Beatty. In 1896 and 1897, the Cape Government Railways (CGR) placed a second batch of fifty 6th Class 4-6-0 locomotives in service, which would be designated Class 6A on the South African Railways (SAR) in 1912.

The Type YC first entered service as tenders to these locomotives. More entered service in 1896, as tenders to the Oranje-Vrijstaat Gouwerment-Spoorwegen (OVGS) 6th Class L2, and in 1898, as tenders to the CGR 6th Class of 1898.

== Characteristics ==
The tender, as built, had a coal capacity of 5 long tons 10 hundredweight (5.6 tonnes), a water capacity of 2,590 imperial gallons (11,770 litres) and an average maximum axle load of 10 long tons 8 hundredweight (10,570 kilograms).

== Locomotives ==
In the SAR years, tenders were numbered for the engines they were delivered with. In most cases, an oval number plate, bearing the engine number and often also the tender type, would be attached to the rear end of the tender. During the classification and renumbering of locomotives onto the SAR roster in 1912, no separate classification and renumbering list was published for tenders, which should have been renumbered according to the locomotive renumbering list.

Three locomotive classes were delivered new with Type YC tenders. Bearing in mind that tenders could and did migrate between engines, these tenders should have been numbered in the SAR number ranges as shown.

- 1896: CGR 6th Class of 1896, SAR Class 6A, numbers 441 to 489.
- 1896: OVGS 6th Class L2, SAR Class 6C, numbers 541 to 559 and 561 to 564.
- 1898: CGR 6th Class of 1898, SAR Class 6D, numbers 565 to 597.

== Classification letters ==
Since many tender types are interchangeable between different locomotive classes and types, a tender classification system was adopted by the SAR. The first letter of the tender type indicates the classes of engines to which it could be coupled. The "Y_" tenders could be used with the following locomotive classes:

- CGR Karoo Class of 1903, SAR Class 5A.
- CGR Karoo Class of 1904, SAR Class 5B.
- CGR 6th Class of 1893, SAR Class 6.
- CGR 6th Class of 1896, SAR Class 6A.
- OVGS 6th Class L2, SAR Class 6C.
- CGR 6th Class of 1898, SAR Class 6D.
- CGR 6th Class 2-6-2, SAR Class 6Y.
- CGR 6th Class 2-6-4, SAR Class 6Z.

The second letter indicates the tender's water capacity. The "_C" tenders had a capacity of between 2,590 and 2,600 imperial gallons (11,770 and 11,820 litres; 3,110 and 3,122 US gallons).

== Modification ==
The original slatted upper sides of the tender's coal bunker were often replaced by sheet-metal sides. Some Type YC tenders were fitted with new tanks and modified to increase their coal capacity from 5 long tons 10 hundredweight (5.6 tonnes) to 7 long tons 10 hundredweight (7.6 tonnes). The new tank was slightly bigger, which increased the water capacity from 2,590 to 2,600 imperial gallons (11,770 to 11,820 litres). The maximum average axle load of the modified tender was 11 long tons 1 hundredweight 2 quarters (11,250 kilograms).

== Illustration ==
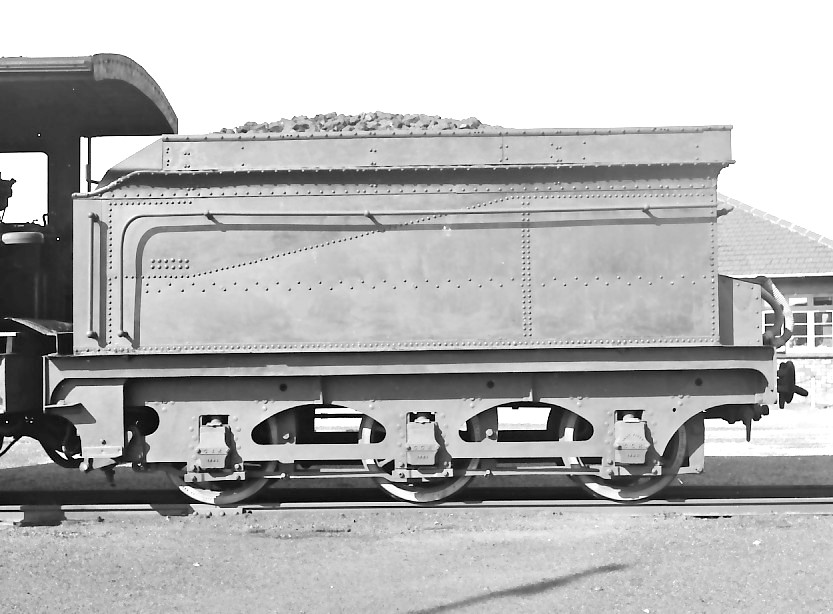
Type YC of SAR Class 6A no. 462, c. 1970

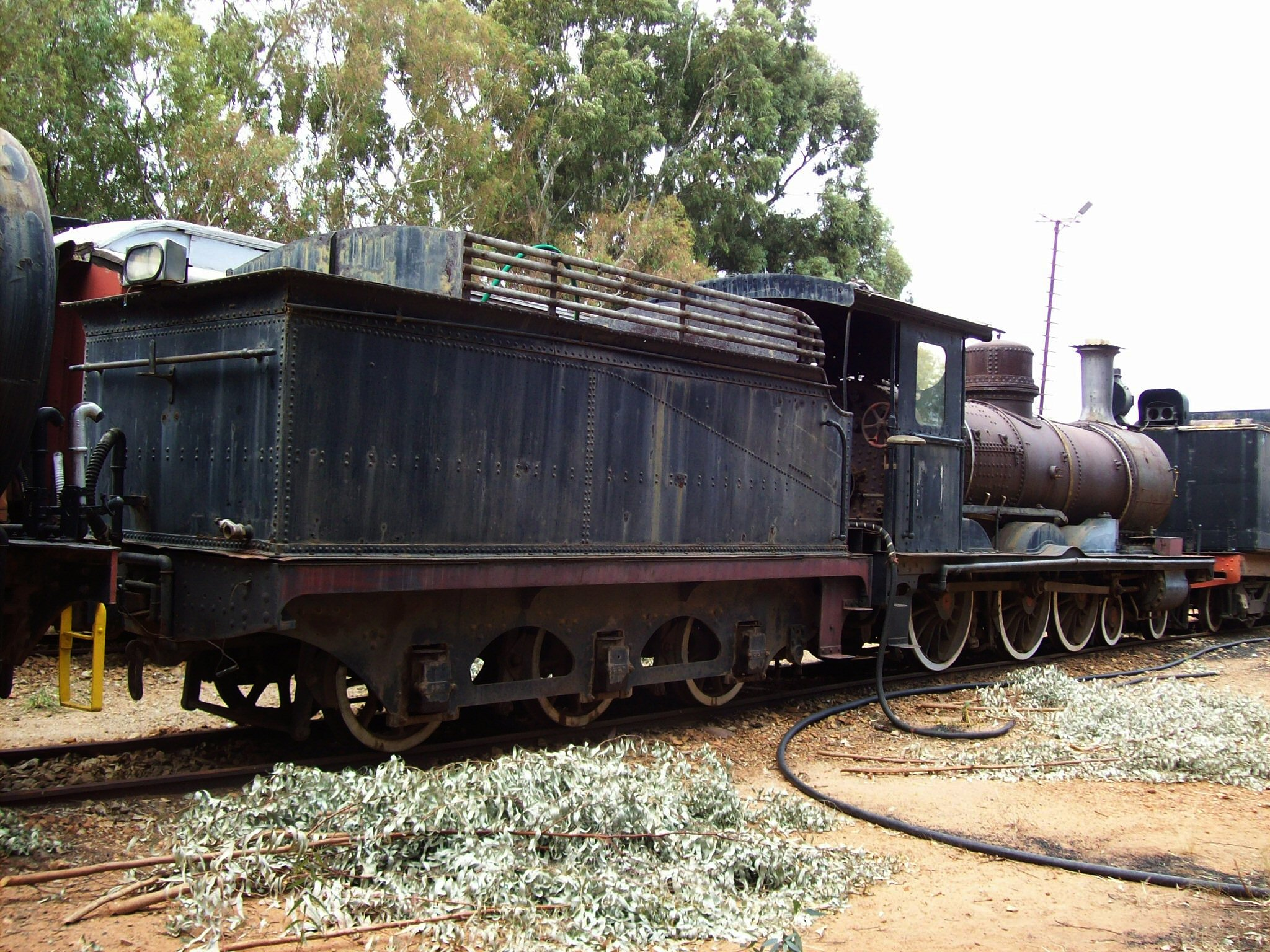
Modified Type YC on SAR Class 6A no. 473, 2010
