= South African type YB tender =

Steam locomotive introduced in 1893

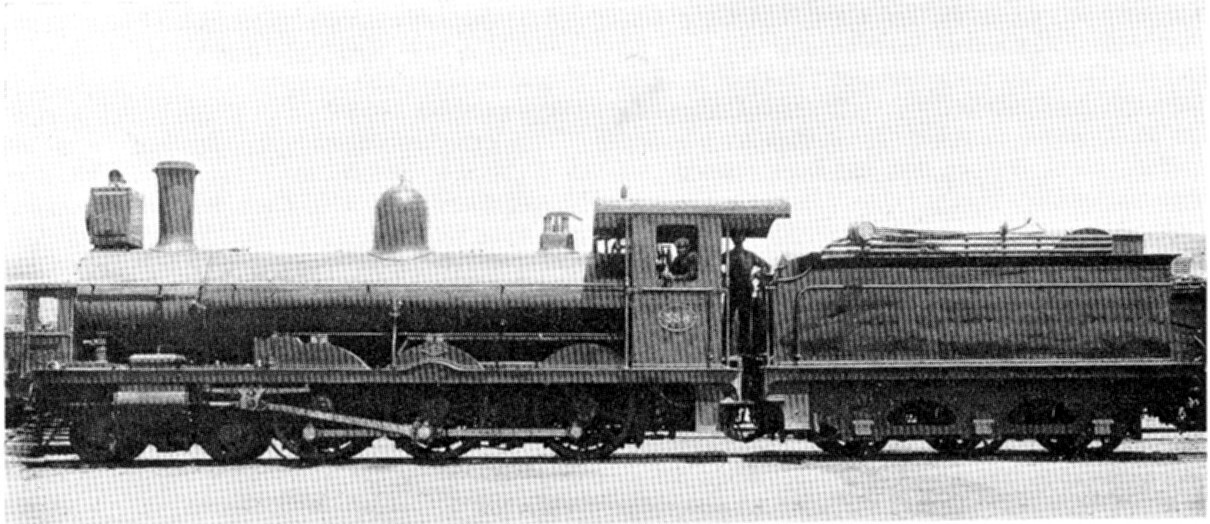
- Type YB tender on CGR 6th Class of 1893
Type and origin
- Locomotive: CGR 6th Class of 1893
- Designer: Cape Government Railways (H.M. Beatty)
- Builder: Dübs and Company
- In service: 1893-1894
Specifications
- Configuration: 3-axle
- Gauge: 3 ft 6 in (1,067 mm) Cape gauge
- Length: 20 ft 5 7/8 in (6,245 mm)
- Wheel dia.: 37 in (940 mm)
- Wheelbase: 10 ft (3,048 mm)
- Axle load: 9 LT 17 cwt (10,010 kg) average
- Weight empty: 31,560 lb (14,320 kg)
- Weight w/o: 29 LT 11 cwt (30,020 kg)
- Fuel type: Coal
- Fuel cap.: 5 LT 10 cwt (5.6 t)
- Water cap.: 2,370 imp gal (10,800 L)
- Stoking: Manual
- Couplers: Drawbar & Johnston link-and-pin
Career
- Operators: Cape Government Railways; Central South African Railways; Imperial Military Railways; OVGS; South African Railways; Sudan Railways
- Numbers: SAR 401-440

The South African type YB tender was a steam locomotive tender from the pre-Union era in the Cape of Good Hope.

The Type YB tender entered service in 1893, as tenders to the first 6th Class 4-6-0 Tenwheeler type steam locomotives to be acquired by the Cape Government Railways. These locomotives were designated Class 6 on the South African Railways in 1912.

== Manufacturer ==
Type YB tenders were built by Dübs and Company in 1893 and 1894.

The Cape Government Railways (CGR) placed its first forty 6th Class 4-6-0 Tenwheeler type steam locomotives in service in 1893 and 1894. The locomotive and tender were designed in 1892 at the Salt River works in Cape Town, under the supervision of Western System Locomotive Superintendent H.M. Beatty.

The Type YB entered service as tenders to these locomotives, which were distributed between the Western and Midland Systems of the CGR. In 1912, these locomotives were designated Class 6 on the South African Railways (SAR).

== Characteristics ==
The tender had a coal capacity of 5 long tons 10 hundredweight (5.6 tonnes), a water capacity of 2,370 imperial gallons (10,800 litres) and an average maximum axle load of 9 long tons 17 hundredweight (10,010 kilograms).

== Locomotive ==
Only Class 6 locomotives were delivered new with Type YB tenders. In the SAR years, tenders were numbered for the engines they were delivered with. In most cases, an oval number plate, bearing the engine number and often also the tender type, would be attached to the rear end of the tender. During the classification and renumbering of locomotives onto the SAR roster in 1912, no separate classification and renumbering list was published for tenders, which should have been renumbered according to the locomotive renumbering list. Bearing in mind that tenders could and did migrate between engines, the Type YB tenders should have been numbered in the SAR number range from 401 to 440.

== Classification letters ==
Since many tender types are interchangeable between different locomotive classes and types, a tender classification system was adopted by the SAR. The first letter of the tender type indicates the classes of engines to which it could be coupled. The "Y_" tenders could be used with the following locomotive classes:

- CGR Karoo Class of 1903, SAR Class 5A.
- CGR Karoo Class of 1904, SAR Class 5B.
- CGR 6th Class of 1893, SAR Class 6.
- CGR 6th Class of 1896, SAR Class 6A.
- Oranje-Vrijstaat Gouwerment-Spoorwegen 6th Class L2, SAR Class 6C.
- CGR 6th Class of 1898, SAR Class 6D.
- CGR 6th Class 2-6-2, SAR Class 6Y.
- CGR 6th Class 2-6-4, SAR Class 6Z.

The second letter indicates the tender's water capacity. The "_B" tenders had a capacity of 2,370 imperial gallons (10,800 litres; 2,850 US gallons).
