= South African Class 6A 4-6-0 =

1896 design of steam locomotive

CGR 6th Class 4-6-0 1896 South African Class 6A 4-6-0
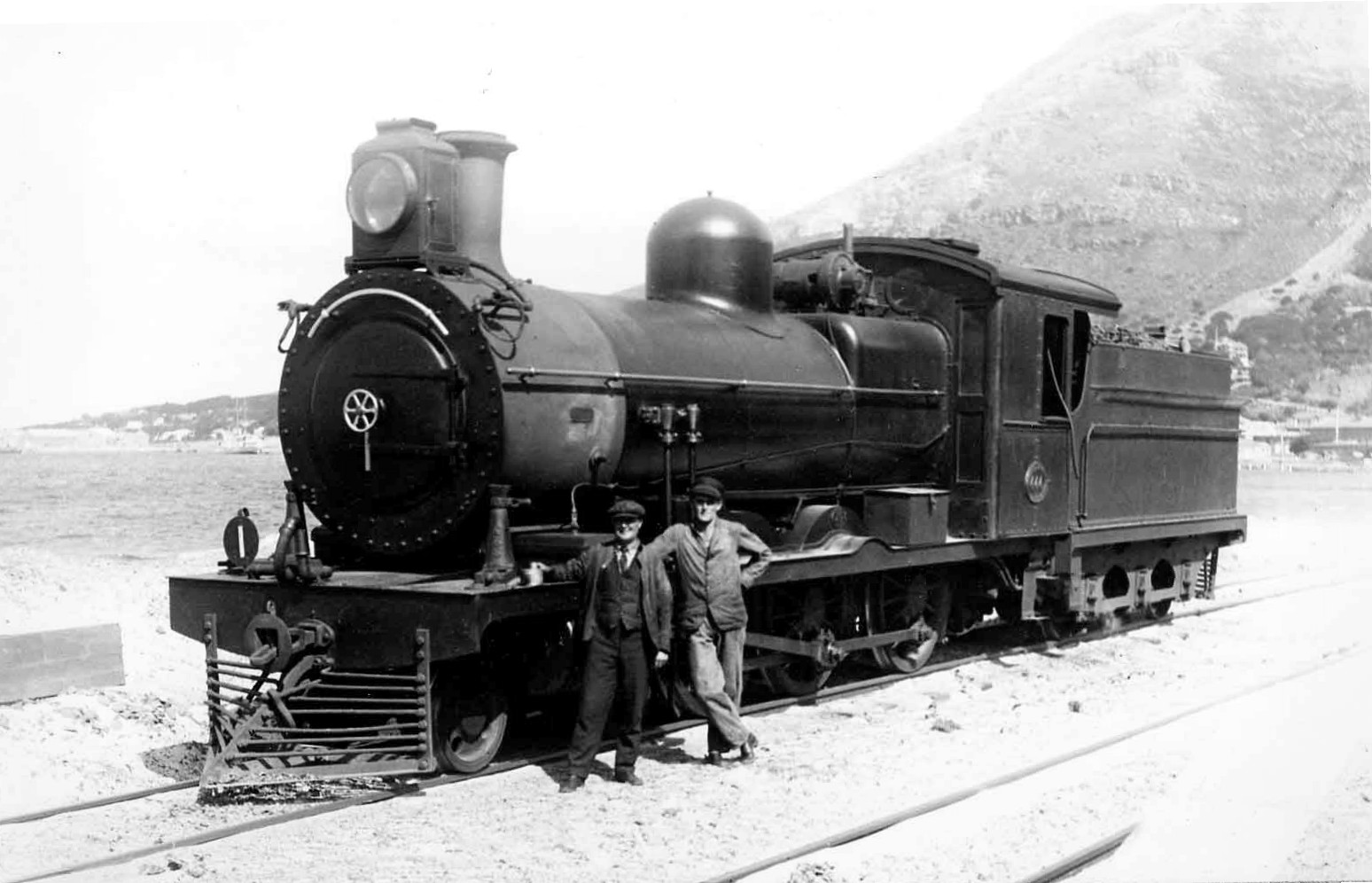
- SAR no. 444 with a Belpaire firebox, near Clovelly, c. 1930
Type and origin
- ♠ Original locomotive, as built ♥ Locomotive equipped with Belpaire firebox
- Power type: Steam
- Designer: Cape Government Railways (H.M. Beatty)
- Builder: Dübs and Company; Sharp, Stewart and Company
- Serial number: Dübs: 3330, 3332-3335, 3337, 3345-3347, 3437-3439, 3441-3447, 3449-3456, 3460-3466, 3469-3471, 3475-3476; Sharp Stewart: 4116-4119, 4122-4127, 4144
- Model: CGR 6th Class
- Build date: 1895–1897
- Total produced: 50
Specifications
- Configuration
  - Whyte: 4-6-0 (Tenwheeler)
  - UIC: 2'Cn2
- Driver: 2nd coupled axle
- Gauge: 3 ft 6 in (1,067 mm) Cape gauge
- Leading dia.: 28 1/2 in (724 mm)
- Coupled dia.: 54 in (1,372 mm)
- Tender wheels: 37 in (940 mm)
- Wheelbase: 42 ft 5/8 in (12,817 mm)
  - Axle spacing (Asymmetrical): 1-2: 4 ft 9 in (1,448 mm); 2-3: 6 ft 3 in (1,905 mm)
  - Engine: 20 ft 3 3/4 in (6,191 mm)
  - Leading: 5 ft 5 1/2 in (1,664 mm)
  - Coupled: 11 ft (3,353 mm)
  - Tender: 10 ft (3,048 mm)
- Length
  - Over couplers: 51 ft 3 5/8 in (15,637 mm)
- Height: ♠ 12 ft 10 in (3,912 mm) ♥ 12 ft 10 3/8 in (3,921 mm)
- Frame type: Plate
- Axle load: ♠ 11 LT 18 cwt (12,090 kg) ♥ 13 LT 8 cwt (13,620 kg)
  - Leading: ♠ 11 LT 7 cwt (11,530 kg) ♥ 10 LT 17 cwt 2 qtr (11,050 kg)
  - Coupled: ♥ 13 LT 8 cwt (13,620 kg)
  - 1st coupled: ♠ 11 LT 5 cwt (11,430 kg)
  - 2nd coupled: ♠ 11 LT 18 cwt (12,090 kg)
  - 3rd coupled: ♠ 11 LT 5 cwt (11,430 kg)
  - Tender axle: 10 LT 8 cwt (10,570 kg) average
- Adhesive weight: ♠ 34 LT 8 cwt (34,950 kg) ♥ 40 LT 4 cwt (40,850 kg)
- Loco weight: ♠ 45 LT 15 cwt (46,480 kg) ♥ 51 LT 1 cwt 2 qtr (51,890 kg)
- Tender weight: 31 LT 4 cwt (31,700 kg)
- Total weight: ♠ 76 LT 19 cwt (78,180 kg) ♥ 82 LT 5 cwt 2 qtr (83,600 kg)
- Tender type: YC (3-axle); YB, YC, YE, YE1 permitted
- Fuel type: Coal
- Fuel capacity: 5 LT 10 cwt (5.6 t)
- Water cap.: 2,590 imp gal (11,770 L)
- Firebox
  - Type: ♠ Round-top – ♥ Belpaire
  - Grate area: ♠ 16.625 sq ft (1.5445 m^{2}) ♥ 16.6 sq ft (1.54 m^{2})
- Boiler
  - Pitch: ♠ 6 ft 8 in (2,032 mm) ♥ 7 ft (2,134 mm)
  - Diameter: ♠ 4 ft 4 in (1,321 mm) ♥ 4 ft 9 in (1,448 mm)
  - Tube plates: ♠ 11 ft 2 1/8 in (3,407 mm) ♥ 11 ft 2 1/8 in (3,407 mm)
  - Small tubes: ♠ 185: 1 7/8 in (48 mm) ♥ 220: 2 in (51 mm)
- Boiler pressure: ♠ 160 psi (1,103 kPa) ♥ 180 psi (1,241 kPa)
- Safety valve: Ramsbottom
- Heating surface
  - Firebox: ♠ 101 sq ft (9.4 m^{2}) ♥ 111 sq ft (10.3 m^{2})
  - Tubes: ♠ 1,015 sq ft (94.3 m^{2}) ♥ 1,287.5 sq ft (119.61 m^{2})
  - Total surface: ♠ 1,116 sq ft (103.7 m^{2}) ♥ 1,398.5 sq ft (129.92 m^{2})
- Cylinders: Two
- Cylinder size: 17 in (432 mm) bore 26 in (660 mm) stroke
- Valve gear: Stephenson
- Couplers: Johnston link-and-pin AAR knuckle (1930s)
Performance figures
- Tractive effort: ♠ 16,690 lbf (74.2 kN) @ 75% ♥ 18,780 lbf (83.5 kN) @ 75%
Career
- Operators: Cape Government Railways; Imperial Military Railways; Benguela Railway; South African Railways; Sudan Railways
- Class: CGR 6th Class, SAR Class 6A
- Number in class: 50 CGR, 49 SAR
- Numbers: CGR 161-201, 371-376, 660-662 (371-376 renumbered 571-576); IMR C501, C503, C509 & C510; Benguela 21; SAR 441-489
- Delivered: 1896–1897
- First run: 1896
- Withdrawn: 1973

The South African Railways Class 6A 4-6-0 of 1896 was a steam locomotive from the pre-Union era in the Cape of Good Hope.

In 1896 and 1897, the Cape Government Railways placed a second batch of fifty 6th Class 4-6-0 steam locomotives in service, forty-one on its Western System, six on its Midland System and three on its Eastern System. During the Second Boer War, four of them were transferred to the Imperial Military Railways on loan, and in 1907 one was sold to the Benguela Railway in Angola. In 1912, when the remaining forty-nine locomotives were assimilated into the South African Railways, they were renumbered and designated Class 6A.

== Manufacturers ==
The 6th Class 4-6-0 passenger steam locomotive was designed at the Salt River works of the Cape Government Railways (CGR) at the same time as the 7th Class, both according to the specifications of Michael Stephens, at the time the Chief Locomotive Superintendent of the CGR, and under the supervision of H.M. Beatty, at the time the Locomotive Superintendent of the Cape Western System.

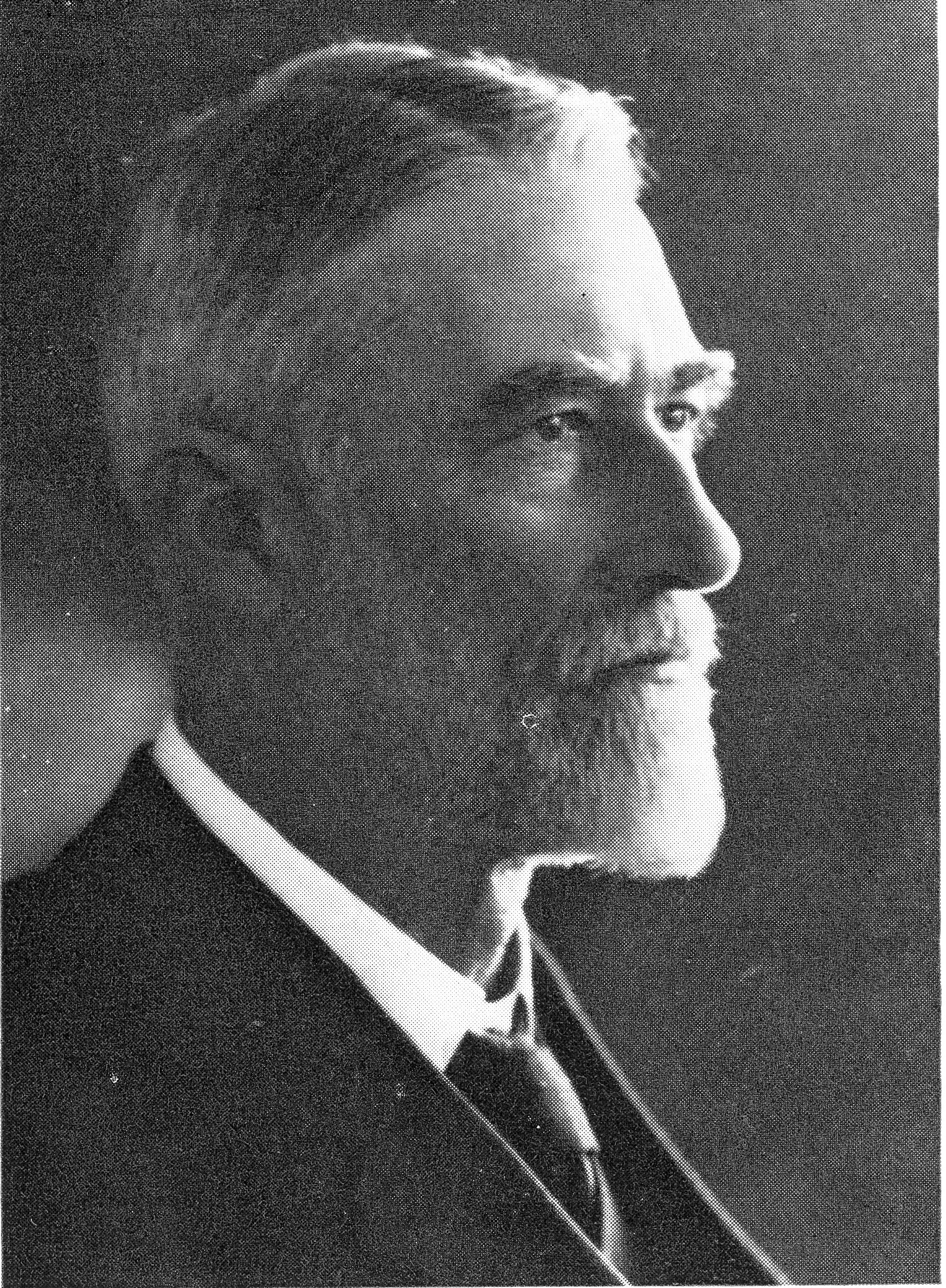
H.M. Beatty

Between 1895 and 1897, the fifty locomotives in this second batch of the 6th Class were built by Dübs and Company and Sharp, Stewart and Company. They were delivered in 1896 and 1897, numbered in the ranges from 161 to 201 for the CGR's Western System, 371 to 376 for the Midland System and 660 to 662 for the Eastern System.

These locomotives differed from those of the previous order by having slightly larger boilers with an increased heating surface. They were the first to be delivered with Type YC tenders, which had the same coal capacity as the earlier Type YB tender of 1893, but with a water capacity of 2,590 imperial gallons (11,770 litres), compared to the 2,370 imperial gallons (10,800 litres) of the Type YB.

== Class 6 sub-classes ==
When the Union of South Africa was established on 31 May 1910, the three Colonial government railways (CGR, Natal Government Railways (NGR) and Central South African Railways (CSAR)) were united under a single administration to control and administer the railways, ports and harbours of the Union. Although the South African Railways and Harbours came into existence in 1910, the actual classification and renumbering of all the rolling stock of the three constituent railways were only implemented with effect from 1 January 1912.

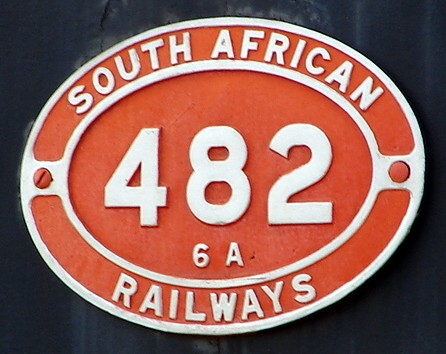

In 1912, all but one of these fifty locomotives were assimilated into the SAR, designated Class 6A and renumbered in the range from 441 to 489.

The rest of the CGR's 6th Class locomotives, together with the Classes 6-L1 to 6-L3 locomotives which had been inherited by the CSAR from the Oranje-Vrijstaat Gouwerment-Spoorwegen (OVGS) via the Imperial Military Railways (IMR), were grouped into thirteen more sub-classes by the SAR. The 4-6-0 locomotives became SAR Classes 6, 6B to 6H and 6J to 6L, the 2-6-2 locomotives became Class 6Y and the 2-6-4 locomotives became Class 6Z.

== Modifications ==
Several of the CSAR's Class 6-L1 to 6-L3 locomotives were modified by P.A Hyde, Chief Mechanical Engineer (CME) of the CSAR, by having their round-topped fireboxes replaced with larger boilers and Belpaire fireboxes and by having larger, more sheltered cabs installed. This conversion improved their performance tremendously and resulted in several of the Classes 6, 6A and 6B locomotives being similarly modified by the SAR in later years, but without altering their classifications.

During the 1930s, many of them were modified once again, when the CME of the SAR at the time, A.G. Watson, reboilered them with round-topped fireboxes once again, but retaining the larger cabs. Once again, they retained their classifications.

== Service ==
=== South Africa ===
The Class 6 family of locomotives were introduced primarily as passenger locomotives, but when the class became displaced by larger and more powerful locomotive classes, it literally became a "Jack-of-all-trades" which proved itself as one of the most useful and successful locomotive classes ever to be designed at the Salt River shops. It went on to see service in all parts of the country, except in Natal, and was used on all types of traffic.

In July 1956 at 60 years of age, Class 6A Belpaire no. 482 was still in service at Port Elizabeth and at times still worked the mainline on work trains or pickup work. When she was eventually retired, she was plinthed inside the main entrance to the electric locomotive shops at Koedoespoort in Pretoria.

=== IMR, Angola and Sudan ===
One of these locomotives was sold to the Benguela Railway in Angola, while another four saw service with the IMR during the Second Boer War.

During the Second World War, sixteen of the Classes 6 to 6D were transferred to the Middle East to assist with the war effort during the North African Campaign. The four Class 6A locomotives in this group were numbers 465, 472, 475 and 479. They were sold to the Sudan Railways Corporation in 1942 and were renumbered in the range from M707 to M710, in the same order as their former SAR engine numbers.

== Renumbering ==
During their long service lives, some of the Class 6A locomotives underwent multiple renumbering. All were initially numbered into the CGR's Western, Midland and Eastern Systems rosters. The Midland System's locomotives, numbered in the range from 371 to 376, were later renumbered in the range from 571 to 576. The then vacant engine numbers in the range from 371 to 376 were later re-allocated to Class 8D locomotives which were delivered in 1902.

The four locomotives which were loaned to the IMR during the Second Boer War, were renumbered C501, C503, C509 and C510 for the duration of their IMR service, while the one which was sold to Angola became the Benguela Railway's no. 21.

The remaining 49 locomotives were eventually renumbered into the SAR's roster in 1912 and received SAR numbers in the range from 441 to 489. The table reflects all their renumbering as well as their builders and works numbers.

Class 6A 4-6-0 Builders, works numbers and renumbering
Builder	Year built	Works no.	CGR no.	CGR new no.	IMR no.	Benguela no.	SAR no.	Sudan no.
Dübs	1895	3332	161				441	
Sharp Stewart	1896	4124	162				442	
Sharp Stewart	1896	4122	163				443	
Sharp Stewart	1896	4123	164				444	
Dübs	1895	3330	165				445	
Dübs	1895	3334	166				446	
Sharp Stewart	1896	4126	167				447	
Dübs	1895	3335	168				448	
Sharp Stewart	1896	4127	169				449	
Dübs	1895	3337	170				450	
Dübs	1895	3345	171				451	
Sharp Stewart	1896	4125	172				452	
Dübs	1895	3346	173				453	
Dübs	1895	3347	174				454	
Dübs	1895	3333	175				455	
Sharp Stewart	1896	4144	176				456	
Dübs	1897	3437	177				457	
Dübs	1897	3438	178				458	
Dübs	1897	3439	179				459	
Dübs	1897	3441	180				460	
Dübs	1897	3442	181				461	
Dübs	1897	3443	182		C509		462	
Dübs	1897	3444	183		C510		463	
Dübs	1897	3445	184				464	
Dübs	1897	3446	185			21		
Dübs	1897	3447	186				465	M707
Dübs	1897	3449	187				466	
Dübs	1897	3450	188				467	
Dübs	1897	3451	189				468	
Dübs	1897	3452	190				469	
Dübs	1897	3455	191				470	
Dübs	1897	3456	192				471	
Dübs	1897	3460	193				472	M708
Dübs	1897	3461	194				473	
Dübs	1897	3462	195				474	
Dübs	1897	3463	196				475	M709
Dübs	1897	3464	197				476	
Dübs	1897	3465	198				477	
Dübs	1897	3466	199		C503		478	
Dübs	1897	3475	200		C501		479	M710
Dübs	1897	3476	201				480	
Sharp Stewart	1896	4116	371	571			481	
Sharp Stewart	1896	4117	372	572			482	
Sharp Stewart	1896	4118	373	573			483	
Sharp Stewart	1896	4119	374	574			484	
Dübs	1897	3453	375	575			485	
Dübs	1897	3454	376	576			486	
Dübs	1897	3469	660				487	
Dübs	1897	3470	661				488	
Dübs	1897	3471	662				489	

== Preserved Locomotives ==
Four of these Class 6A locomotives still exist.

- No. 454 Lauren is owned by Shaun Ackerman and is under restoration at Germiston Steam Depot.
- No. 462 is on static display at the Big Hole Museum at Kimberley.
- No. 473 Patricia is owned by Clive Holliday and was released to traffic on 20th September 2025 after a full heavy overhaul lasting 7 years by Fairlie Projects (Shaun Ackerman). It is currently the oldest operational Cape Gauge locomotive in South Africa. Currently based at Voorbaai steam depot.
- No. 482 is plinthed at Pretoria's Koedoespoort Workshops with a Sheldon Steam Crane. This engine is preserved in a safe and friendly environment.

== Illustration ==
Round-topped fireboxes

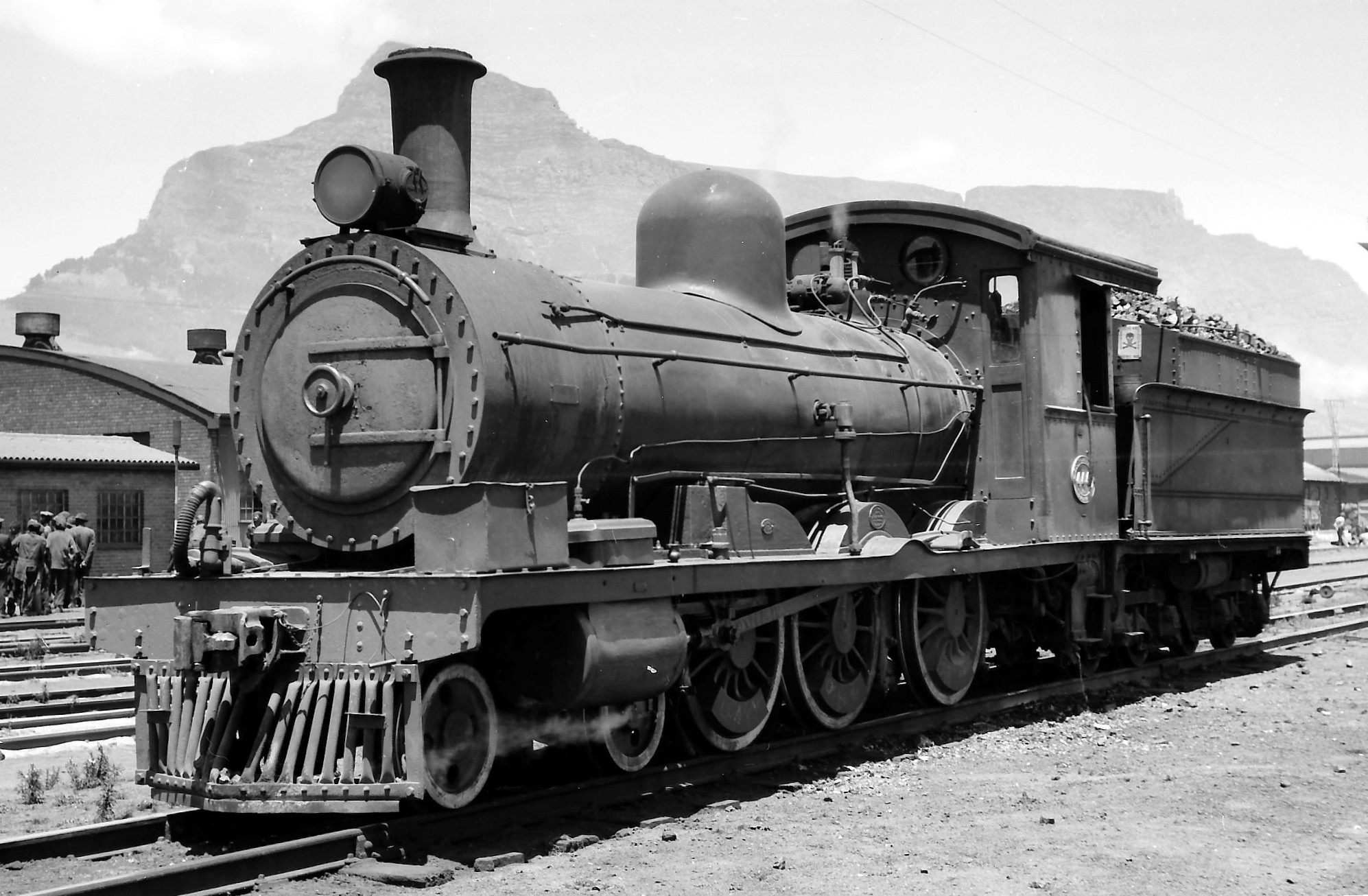
Sharp, Stewart-built ex Western System no. 164, SAR no. 444, with round-topped firebox and Type YC tender, December 1965

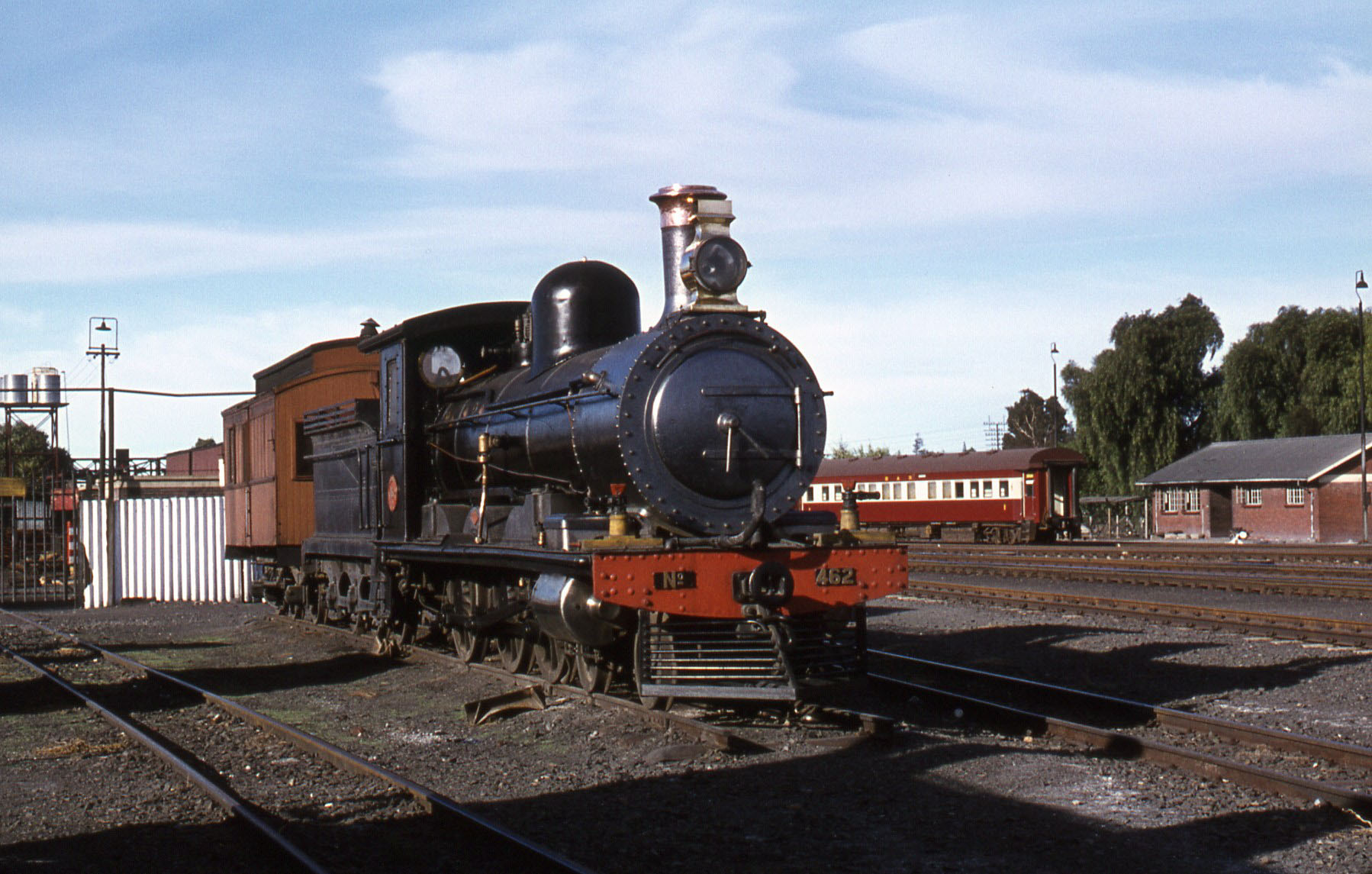
Dübs-built ex CGR no. 182, IMR no. C509, SAR no. 462, with a round-topped firebox and Type YC three-axle tender

Belpaire fireboxes

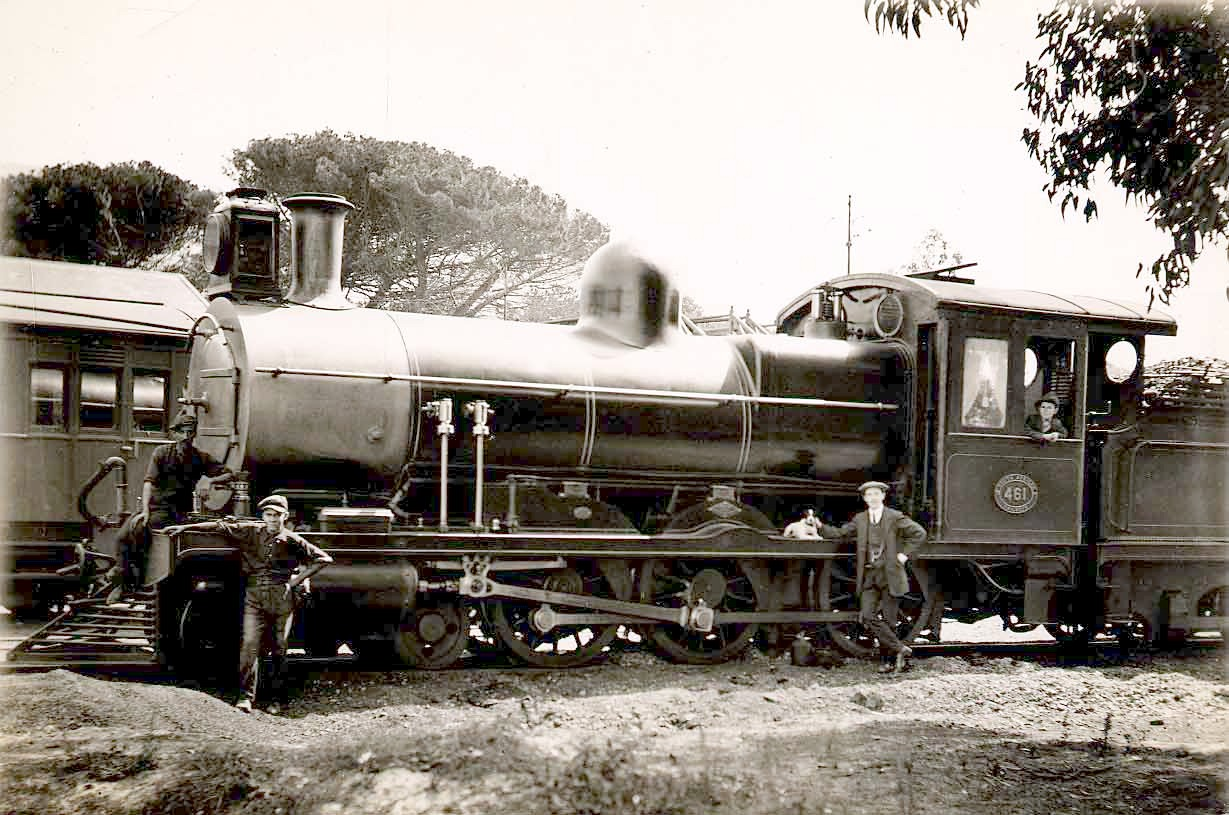
Dübs-built ex Western System no. 181, SAR no. 461, with a Belpaire firebox and Type YC three-axle tender

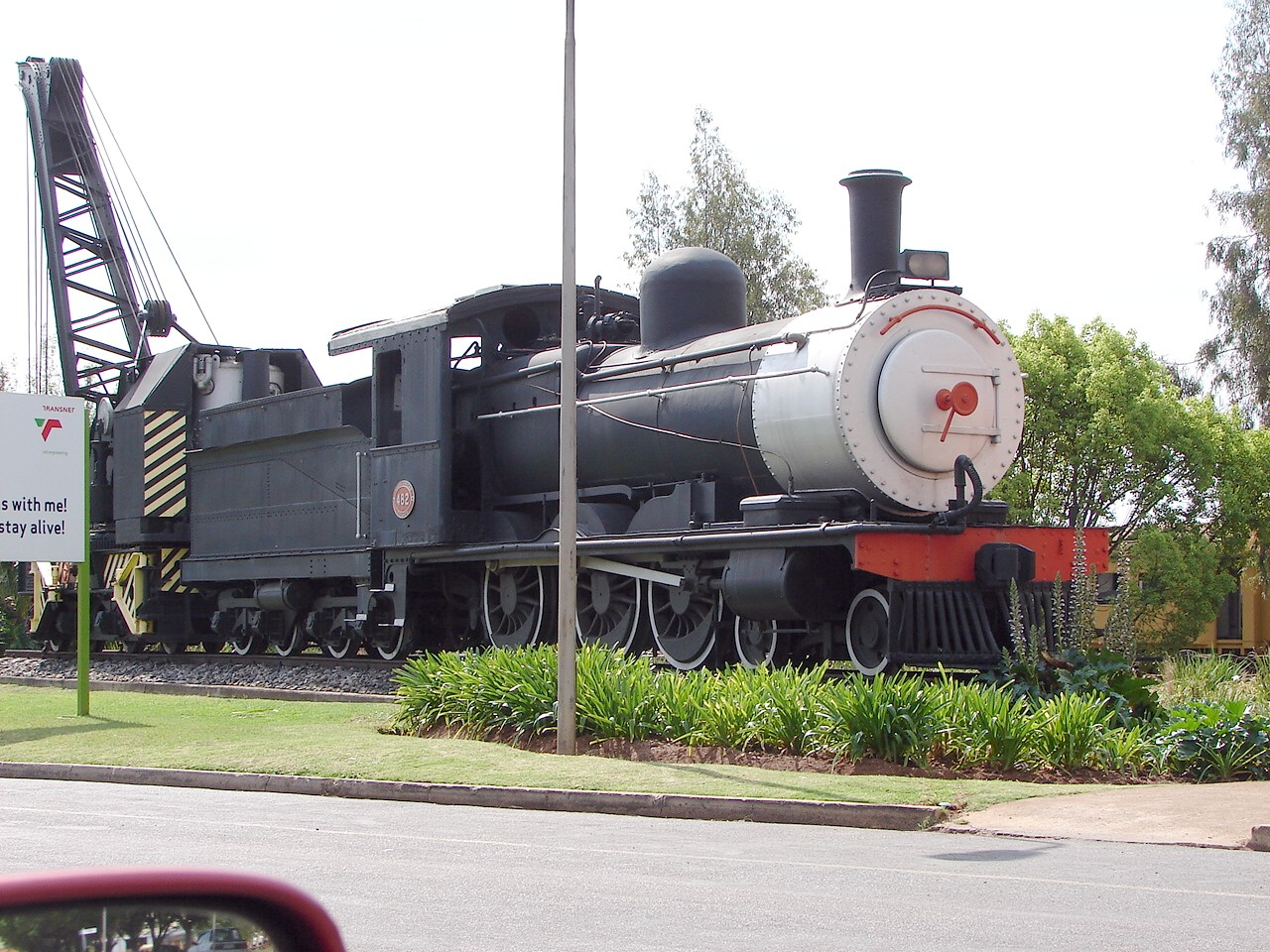
Sharp, Stewart-built ex Midland System no. 372, SAR no. 482, with a bogie tender, Koedoespoort, 30 Sept. 2009
