= Hazlitt Beatty =

H. M. Beatty
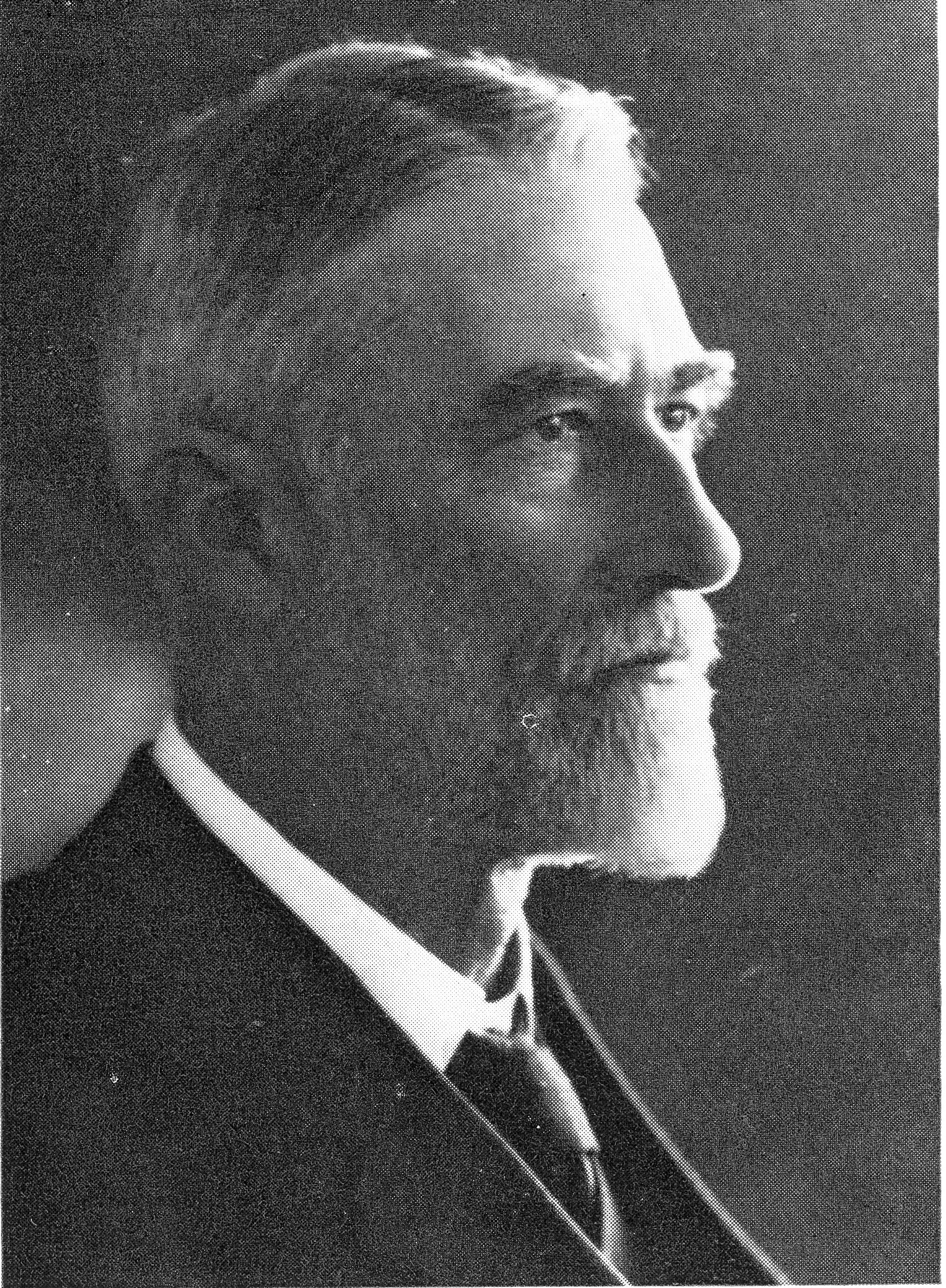
- Died: 1916; Rondebosch
- Engineering career
- Discipline: Mechanical / Locomotive
- Employer: Cape Government Railways

Hazlitt Michael Beatty was Cape Government Railways (Western System) Locomotive Superintendent (1885–1896) and Cape Government Railways Chief Locomotive Superintendent (1896–1910).

== Locomotives ==
By 1901, it was becoming increasingly apparent that a larger and more powerful version of the successful Cape Government Railways 6th Class locomotives would require fireboxes with appreciably larger grate areas. This was not possible with the existing type of frame on a Cape gauge locomotive, where the firebox was arranged between the rearmost coupled wheels. To overcome this problem, Beatty prepared designs for a new Cape 6th Class locomotive with a 2-6-2 wheel arrangement of which the frame terminated in front of the firebox, where it connected to a casting termed the "bridle casting". This casting extended out on either side and had wider spaced frames attached to its rear, which allowed a wider and deeper firebox. This was the first time that such a method of widening the frame had been used and it proved to be so successful that it was copied widely by both the Natal Government Railways (NGR) and the Central South African Railways (CSAR) in their subsequent locomotive designs. The one disadvantage of the bridle casting was that it proved prone to serious damage in even minor collisions. The design was applied to South African locomotives for many years to come, until boiler centre lines were raised to a height which permitted the main frames to be reduced in depth and therefore to continue right through to the rear buffer beam.

He died in 1916 at Rondebosch.

== See also ==
- Category:H.M. Beatty locomotives
