= South African type YE tender =

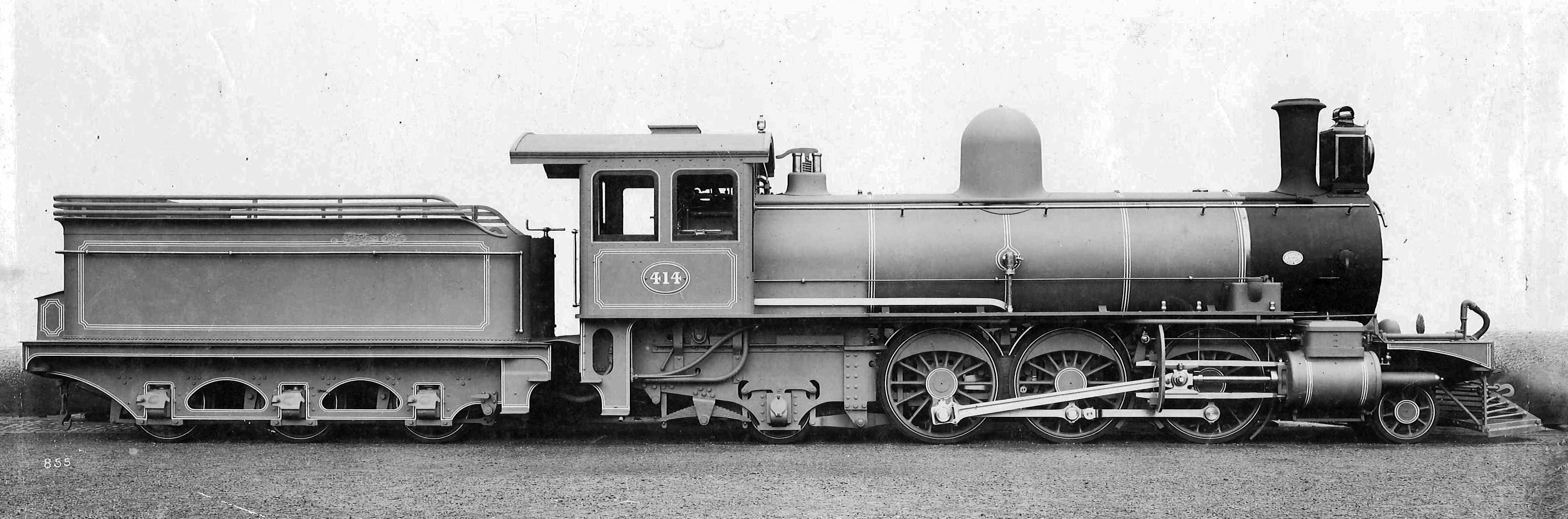
- Type YE tender on CGR 6th Class 2-6-4
Type and origin
- Locomotive: CGR Karoo Class of 1903; CGR 6th Class 2-6-2; CGR 6th Class 2-6-4
- Designer: Cape Government Railways (H.M. Beatty)
- Builder: Kitson and Company; Neilson, Reid and Company
- In service: 1901, 1903
Specifications
- Configuration: 3-axle
- Gauge: 3 ft 6 in (1,067 mm) Cape gauge
- Length: 21 ft 4 3/8 in (6,512 mm)
- Wheel dia.: 37 in (940 mm)
- Wheelbase: 10 ft (3,048 mm)
- Axle load: 10 LT 17 cwt (11,020 kg)
  - 1st axle: 10 LT 8 cwt (10,570 kg)
  - 2nd axle: 10 LT 15 cwt (10,920 kg)
  - 3rd axle: 10 LT 17 cwt (11,020 kg)
- Weight empty: 33,164 lb (15,043 kg)
- Weight w/o: 32 LT (32,510 kg)
- Fuel type: Coal
- Fuel cap.: 5 LT 10 cwt (5.6 t)
- Water cap.: 2,825 imp gal (12,800 L)
- Stoking: Manual
- Couplers: Drawbar & Johnston link-and-pin
Career
- Operators: Cape Government Railways; South African Railways
- Numbers: SAR 711-720, 903 & 904

The South African type YE tender was a steam locomotive tender from the pre-Union era in the Cape of Good Hope.

The Type YE tender first entered service in 1901, as tenders to the first four 6th Class 2-6-2 Prairie type steam locomotives of the Cape Government Railways, which were soon modified to a 2-6-4 Adriatic wheel arrangement. These locomotives were designated Class 6Z on the South African Railways in 1912.

== Manufacturers ==
Type YE tenders were built by Neilson, Reid and Company in 1901 and Kitson and Company in 1903.

In 1901, the Cape Government Railways (CGR) placed four 6th Class steam locomotives with a 2-6-2 Prairie type wheel arrangement in service. The engines were soon modified to a 2-6-4 Adriatic type wheel arrangement. The locomotive and tender were designed at the Salt River works in Cape Town under the supervision of Western System Locomotive Superintendent H.M. Beatty. They would be designated Class 6Z on the South African Railways (SAR) in 1912.

The Type YE first entered service as tenders to these locomotives. More entered service in 1903, as tenders to the CGR Karoo Class of 1903 and the CGR 6th Class 2-6-2.

== Characteristics ==
The tender had a coal capacity of 5 long tons 10 hundredweight (5.6 tonnes), a water capacity of 2,825 imperial gallons (12,800 litres) and a maximum axle load of 10 long tons 17 hundredweight (11,020 kilograms).

== Locomotives ==
In the SAR years, tenders were numbered for the engines they were delivered with. In most cases, an oval number plate, bearing the engine number and often also the tender type, would be attached to the rear end of the tender. During the classification and renumbering of locomotives onto the SAR roster in 1912, no separate classification and renumbering list was published for tenders, which should have been renumbered according to the locomotive renumbering list.

Three locomotive classes were delivered new with Type YE tenders. Bearing in mind that tenders could and did migrate between engines, these tenders should have been numbered in the SAR number ranges as shown.

- 1901: CGR 6th Class 2-6-4, SAR Class 6Z, numbers 713 to 720.
- 1903: CGR Karoo Class of 1903, SAR Class 5A, numbers 903 and 904.
- 1903: CGR 6th Class 2-6-2, SAR Class 6Y, numbers 711 and 712.

== Classification letters ==
Since many tender types are interchangeable between different locomotive classes and types, a tender classification system was adopted by the SAR. The first letter of the tender type indicates the classes of engines to which it could be coupled. The "Y_" tenders could be used with the following locomotive classes:

- CGR Karoo Class of 1903, SAR Class 5A.
- CGR Karoo Class of 1904, SAR Class 5B.
- CGR 6th Class of 1893, SAR Class 6.
- CGR 6th Class of 1896, SAR Class 6A.
- Oranje-Vrijstaat Gouwerment-Spoorwegen 6th Class L2, SAR Class 6C.
- CGR 6th Class of 1898, SAR Class 6D.
- CGR 6th Class 2-6-2, SAR Class 6Y.
- CGR 6th Class 2-6-4, SAR Class 6Z.

The second letter indicates the tender's water capacity. The "_E" tenders had a capacity of between 2,800 and 2,855 imperial gallons (12,700 and 13,000 litres; 3,360 and 3,430 US gallons).

A number, when added after the letter code, indicates differences between similar tender types, such as function, wheelbase or coal bunker capacity.

== Modification ==
The original slatted upper sides of the Type YE tender's coal bunker were soon replaced by sheet-metal sides.

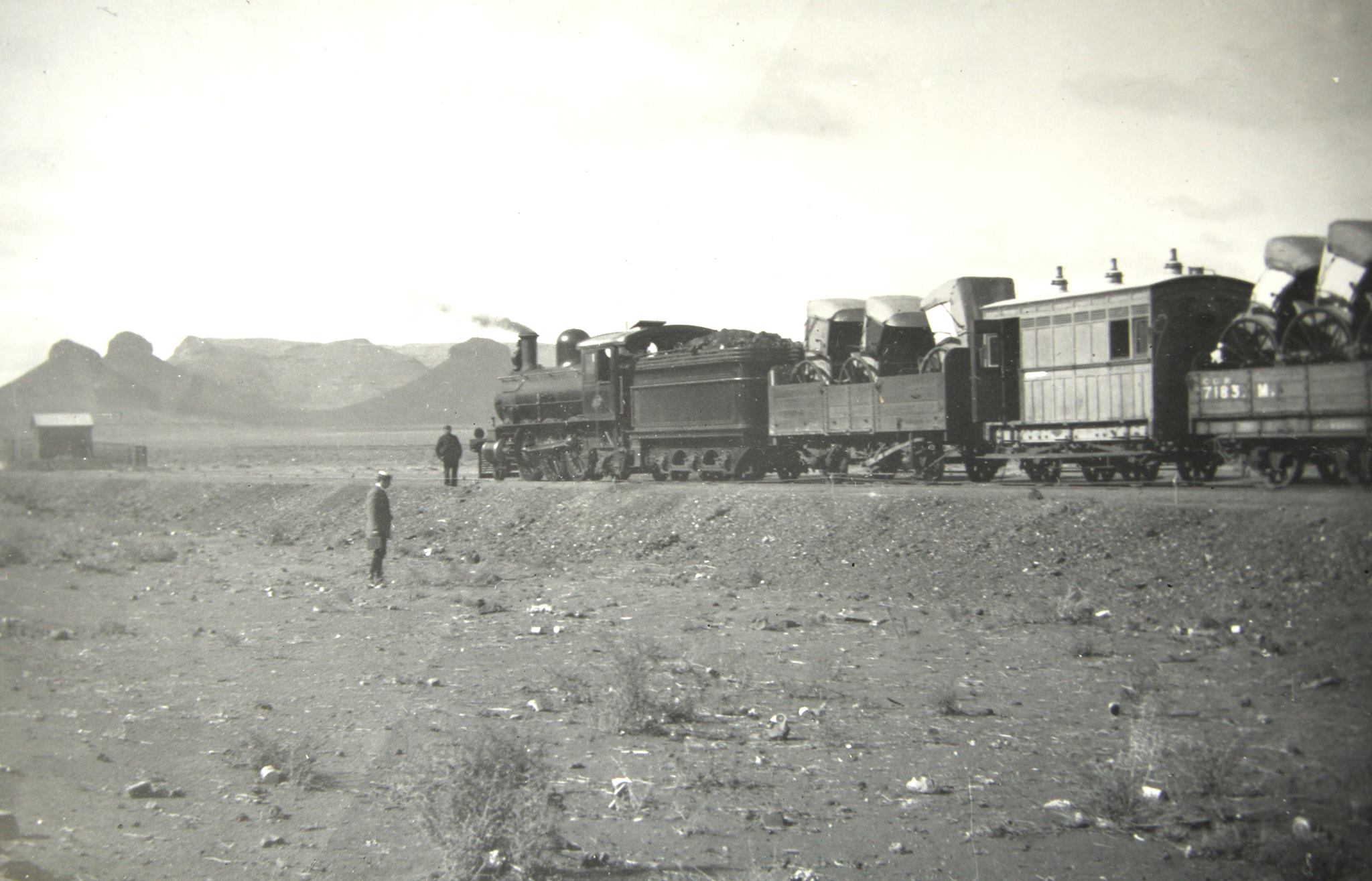
Modified Type YE on CGR 6th Class 2-6-2, Three Sisters, c. 1905
