= South African type XP1 tender =

Steam locomotive tender in South Africa

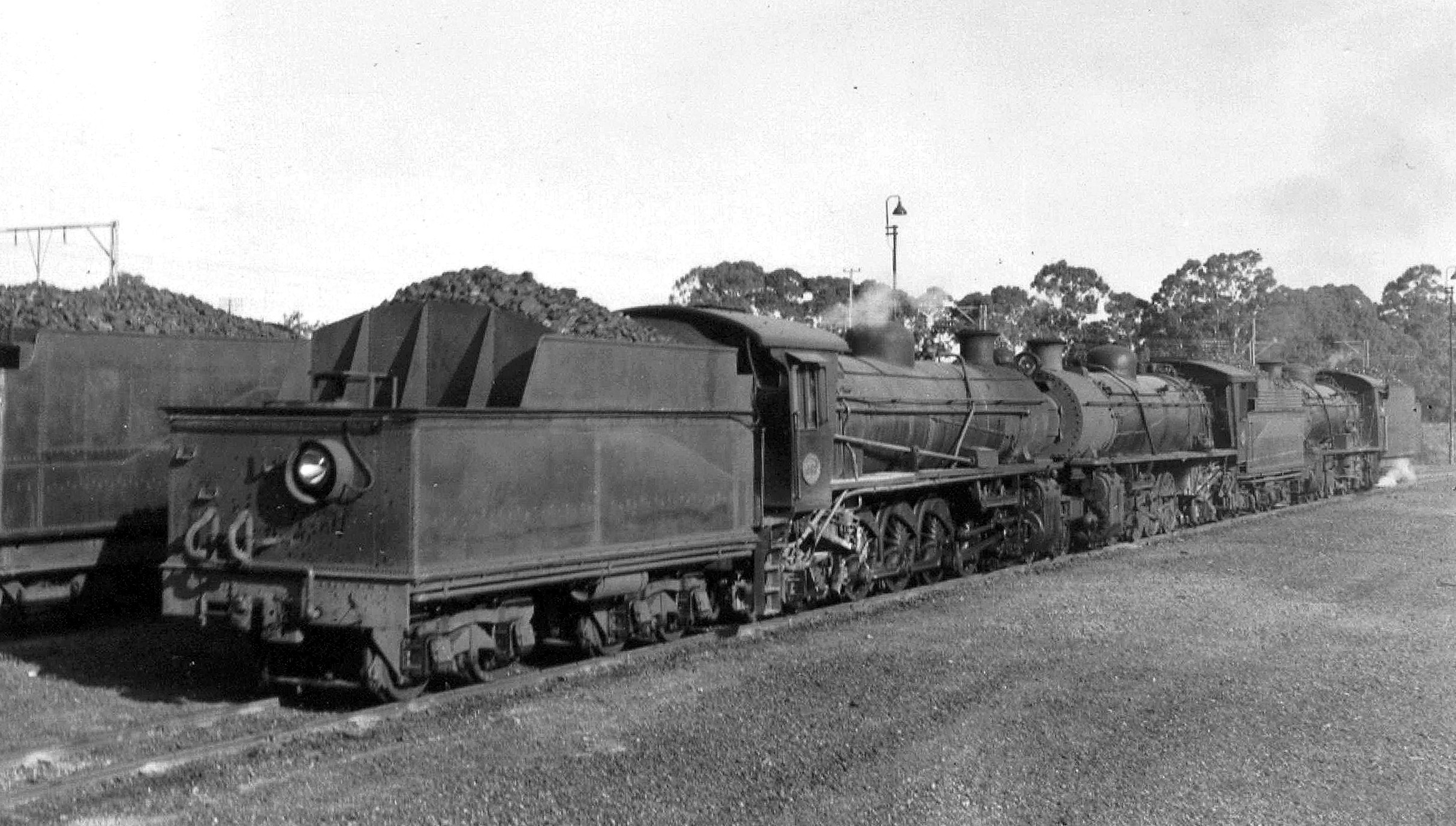
- Type XP1 tender on SAR Class 4AR no. 1560, c. 1961
Type and origin
- Locomotive: SAR Classes MC1, 4AR & 10
- Designer: South African Railways (D.A. Hendrie)
- Builder: North British Locomotive Company
- In service: c. 1940
Specifications
- Configuration: 2-axle bogies
- Gauge: 3 ft 6 in (1,067 mm) Cape gauge
- Length: 25 ft 10 3/4 in (7,893 mm)
- Wheel dia.: 34 in (864 mm)
- Wheelbase: 16 ft 9 in (5,105 mm)
  - Bogie: 4 ft 7 in (1,397 mm)
- Axle load: 13 LT 15 cwt (13,970 kg)
  - Front bogie: 27 LT 10 cwt (27,940 kg)
  - Rear bogie: 23 LT 11 cwt (23,930 kg)
- Weight empty: 49,452 lb (22,431 kg)
- Weight w/o: 51 LT 1 cwt (51,870 kg)
- Fuel type: Coal
- Fuel cap.: 10 LT (10.2 t)
- Water cap.: 4,250 imp gal (19,300 L)
- Stoking: Manual
- Couplers: Drawbar & AAR knuckle
Career
- Operators: South African Railways
- Numbers: SAR 1634

The South African type XP1 tender was a steam locomotive tender.

The Type XP1 tender first entered service in 1913 as a Type MP1, as tender to a Class MC1 Mallet locomotive. One of the Type MP1 tenders was later modified to suit a Class 10 locomotive and reclassified to Type XP1. It was subsequently attached to a Class 4AR locomotive.

== Origin ==
The Type XP1 tender was built as a Type MP1 tender by North British Locomotive Company in 1913.

Type MP1 tenders originally entered South African Railways (SAR) service in 1912, as tenders to Class 12 Mountain type locomotives. The locomotive and tender were designed by D.A. Hendrie, Chief Mechanical Engineer of the SAR. Tenders were numbered for their original engines and an oval number plate, bearing the engine number and often also the tender type, was attached to the rear end of the tender. The particular tender which was to be modified to Type XP1, entered service in 1913 as tender to Class MC1 Mallet no. 1634.

== Rebuilding ==
At some stage, probably after the Class MC1 were withdrawn from service in 1939, the intermediate draw and buffing gear of Type MP1 tender no. 1634 was altered to suit Class 10 4-6-2 Pacific no. 746. This modification converted no. 1634 to the sole Type XP1 tender. During the early 1960s, the tender was attached to Class 4AR Mountain no. 1560. This locomotive and the tender were both withdrawn from service by 1974.

== Characteristics ==
The Type XP1 tender had a water capacity of 4,250 imperial gallons (19,300 litres), a coal capacity of 10 long tons (10.2 tonnes) and a maximum axle load of 13 long tons 15 hundredweight (13,970 kilograms). Type XP1 tender no. 1634 is known to have served as tender to three locomotives of different classes.

- 1913: Class MC1 no. 1634, as Type MP1.
- c. 1940: Class 10 no. 746, as Type XP1.
- c. 1960: Class 4AR no. 1560, as Type XP1.

== Classification letters ==
Since many tender types are interchangeable between different locomotive classes and types, a tender classification system was adopted by the SAR. The first letter of the tender type indicates the classes of engines to which it could be coupled. The "X_" tenders could be used with the locomotive classes as shown.

- Cape Government Railways Mountain, SAR Class 4.
- SAR Class 4A.
- SAR Class 5.
- Cape Government Railways 6th Class of 1897, SAR Class 6B.
- Oranje-Vrijstaat Gouwerment-Spoorwegen 6th Class L3, SAR Class 6E.
- Cape Government Railways 6th Class of 1901 (Neilson, Reid), SAR Class 6H.
- Cape Government Railways 6th Class of 1902, SAR Class 6J.
- Cape Government Railways 8th Class of 1902, SAR Class 8.
- Imperial Military Railways 8th Class, SAR Class 8A.
- Central South African Railways Class 8-L2, SAR Class 8B.
- Central South African Railways Class 8-L3, SAR Class 8C.
- Cape Government Railways 8th Class 4-8-0 of 1903, SAR Class 8D.
- Cape Government Railways 8th Class Experimental, SAR Class 8E.
- Cape Government Railways 8th Class 4-8-0 of 1904, SAR Class 8F.
- Cape Government Railways 8th Class 2-8-0 of 1903, SAR Class 8Y.
- Cape Government Railways 8th Class 2-8-0 of 1904, SAR Class 8Z.
- Central South African Railways Class 9, SAR Class 9.
- Central South African Railways Class 10, SAR Class 10.
- Central South African Railways Class 10-2 Saturated, SAR Class 10A.
- Central South African Railways Class 10-2 Superheated. SAR Class 10B.
- Central South African Railways Class 10-C, SAR Class 10C.
- Central South African Railways Class 11, SAR Class 11.
- Cape Government Railways 9th Class of 1903, SAR Class Experimental 4.
- Cape Government Railways 9th Class of 1906, SAR Class Experimental 5.
- Cape Government Railways 10th Class, SAR Class Experimental 6.
- SAR Class ME.
- Central South African Railways Mallet Superheated, SAR Class MF.

The second letter indicates the tender's water capacity. The "_P" tenders had a capacity of 4,250 imperial gallons (19,300 litres; 5,100 US gallons).

A number, when added after the letter code, indicates differences between similar tender types, such as function, wheelbase or coal bunker capacity. Since no Type XP tender exists, the digit was not necessary in respect of the Type XP1 tender and seems to have been carried over from its previous Type MP1 classification.

== Modifications ==
Prior to the modification of its intermediate draw and buffing gear to convert it to the Type XP1, the tender had already been modified. Most of the Type MP1 tenders were modified by shortening and raising the sides of the coal bunker, in effect making the coal at the rear of the bunker more easily accessible to the stoker and apparently without affecting the tender's coal capacity. The profile of the Type XP1 tender corresponds with the official dimensional drawing of such a modified Type MP1.

== Illustration ==
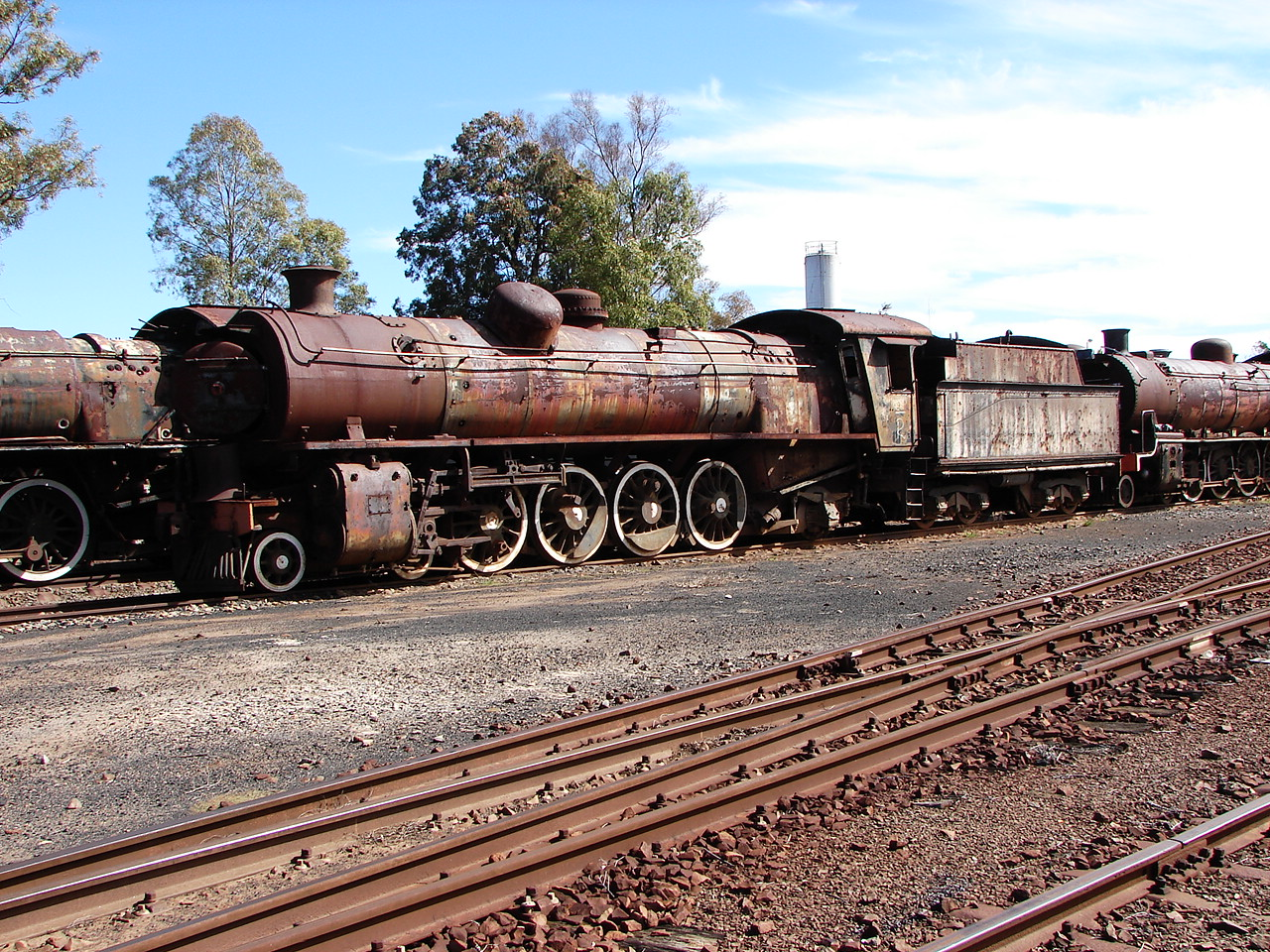
Type XP1 tender on SAR Class 4AR no. 1560, 2013
