= South African type XM2 tender =

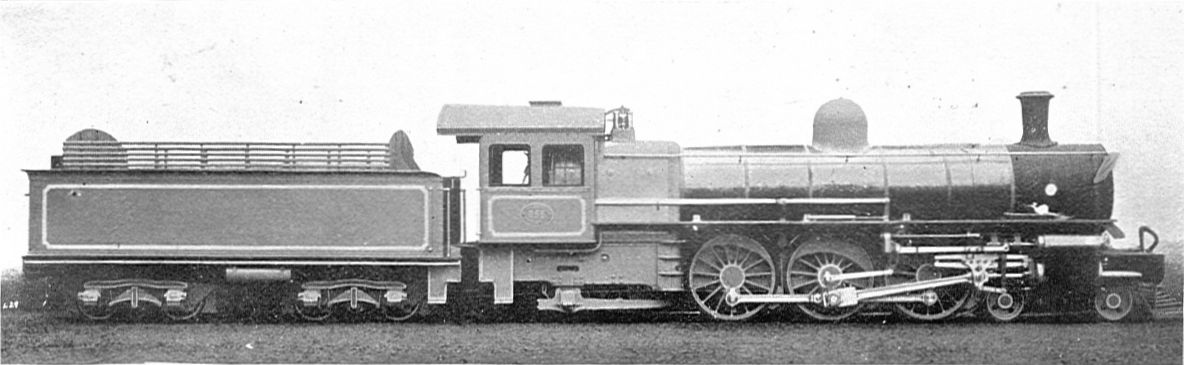
- Type XM2 tender on CSAR Class 10, c. 1904
Type and origin
- Locomotive: CSAR Class 10; CSAR Class 10-2 Saturated; CSAR Class 10-2 Superheated; CSAR Class 11; SAR Class 5
- Designer: Central South African Railways (P.A. Hyde)
- Builder: Beyer, Peacock & Company; North British Locomotive Company; Robert Stephenson & Company; Vulcan Foundry
- Works no.: RS D1540/1-D1540/12
- In service: 1904-1912
Specifications
- Configuration: 2-axle bogies
- Gauge: 3 ft 6 in (1,067 mm) Cape gauge
- Length: 25 ft 11 5/8 in (7,915 mm)
- Wheel dia.: 33 1/2 in (851 mm) as built 34 in (864 mm) retyred
- Wheelbase: 16 ft 9 in (5,105 mm)
  - Bogie: 4 ft 7 in (1,397 mm)
- Axle load: 12 LT 11 cwt 2 qtr (12,780 kg)
  - Front bogie: 24 LT 4 cwt (24,590 kg)
  - Rear bogie: 25 LT 3 cwt (25,550 kg)
- Weight empty: 48,144 lb (21,838 kg)
- Weight w/o: 49 LT 7 cwt (50,140 kg)
- Fuel type: Coal
- Fuel cap.: 10 LT (10.2 t)
- Water cap.: 4,000 imp gal (18,200 L)
- Stoking: Manual
- Couplers: Drawbar & Johnston link-and-pin Drawbar & AAR knuckle (1930s)
Career
- Operators: Central South African Railways; South African Railways
- Numbers: SAR 732-761, 780-783, 912-947, N1-N36

The South African type XM2 tender was a steam locomotive tender from the pre-Union era in Transvaal.

The Type XM2 tender entered service in 1904, as tenders to the Class 10 4-6-2 Pacific type and Class 11 2-8-2 Mikado type steam locomotives which were acquired by the Central South African Railways in that year. In 1912, both locomotive types retained their Class designations on the South African Railways.

== Manufacturers ==
Type XM2 tenders were built between 1904 and 1912 by Beyer, Peacock & Company, North British Locomotive Company and Vulcan Foundry. More Type XM2 tenders were subsequently ordered from Robert Stephenson & Company.

The Central South African Railways (CSAR) placed 15 Class 10 Pacific type and 36 Class 11 Mikado type locomotives in service in 1904. Both locomotives and the tender were designed by P.A. Hyde, Chief Locomotive Superintendent of the CSAR.

The Type XM2 first entered service as tenders to these two locomotive Classes. The Class 10 was acquired to work the passenger trains on the Natal and Cape mainlines out of Johannesburg, while the Class 11 entered service on the Reef to haul coal between Germiston and Witbank.

== Characteristics ==
The tender had a coal capacity of 10 long tons (10.2 tonnes) and a water capacity of 4,000 imperial gallons (18,200 litres), with a maximum axle load of 12 long tons 11 hundredweight (12,750 kilograms).

== Locomotives ==
In the South African Railways (SAR) years, tenders were numbered for the engines they were delivered with. In most cases, an oval number plate, bearing the engine number and tender type, would be attached to the rear end of the tender. During the classification and renumbering of locomotives onto the SAR roster in 1912, no separate classification and renumbering list was published for tenders, which should have been renumbered according to the locomotive renumbering list.

Five locomotive classes were delivered new with Type XM2 tenders. Bearing in mind that tenders could and did migrate between engines, these tenders should have been renumbered in the SAR number ranges as shown.

- 1904: CSAR Class 10, SAR Class 10, numbers 732 to 746.
- 1904: CSAR Class 11, SAR Class 11, numbers 912 to 947.
- 1910: CSAR Class 10-2 Saturated, SAR Class 10A, numbers 747 to 751.
- 1910: CSAR Class 10-2 Superheated, SAR Class 10B, numbers 752 to 761.
- 1912: SAR Class 5, numbers 780 to 783.

Soon after entering service in 1910, the CSAR Class 10-C light Pacific locomotives, acquired for suburban working, were found to be capable of handling mainline passenger trains. To better equip them for mainline working, an order for twelve new Type XM2 tenders for these engines was placed with Robert Stephenson and Company. Since their original smaller Type XC tenders were already numbered for their respective engines, these new tenders, with Robert Stephenson works numbers D1540/1 to D1540/12, were numbered in the non-revenue earning range from N1 to N12.

In addition, 24 more spare Type XM2 tenders were subsequently acquired by the SAR, numbered in the range from N13 to N36.

== Classification letters ==
Since many tender types are interchangeable between different locomotive classes and types, a tender classification system was adopted by the SAR. The first letter of the tender type indicates the classes of engines to which it could be coupled. The "X_" tenders could be used with the following locomotive classes:

- Cape Government Railways Mountain, SAR Class 4.
- SAR Class 4A.
- SAR Class 5.
- Cape Government Railways 6th Class of 1897, SAR Class 6B.
- Oranje-Vrijstaat Gouwerment-Spoorwegen (OVGS) 6th Class L3, SAR Class 6E.
- Cape Government Railways 6th Class of 1901 (Neilson, Reid), SAR Class 6H.
- Cape Government Railways 6th Class of 1902, SAR Class 6J.
- Cape Government Railways 8th Class of 1902, SAR Class 8.
- Imperial Military Railways (IMR) 8th Class, SAR Class 8A.
- CSAR Class 8-L2, SAR Class 8B.
- CSAR Class 8-L3, SAR Class 8C.
- Cape Government Railways 8th Class 4-8-0 of 1903, SAR Class 8D.
- Cape Government Railways 8th Class Experimental, SAR Class 8E.
- Cape Government Railways 8th Class 4-8-0 of 1904, SAR Class 8F.
- Cape Government Railways 8th Class 2-8-0 of 1903, SAR Class 8Y.
- Cape Government Railways 8th Class 2-8-0 of 1904, SAR Class 8Z.
- CSAR Class 9, SAR Class 9.
- CSAR Class 10, SAR Class 10.
- CSAR Class 10-2 Saturated, SAR Class 10A.
- CSAR Class 10-2 Superheated. SAR Class 10B.
- CSAR Class 10-C, SAR Class 10C.
- CSAR Class 11, SAR Class 11.
- Cape Government Railways 9th Class of 1903, SAR Class Experimental 4.
- Cape Government Railways 9th Class of 1906, SAR Class Experimental 5.
- Cape Government Railways 10th Class, SAR Class Experimental 6.
- SAR Class ME.
- CSAR Mallet Superheated, SAR Class MF.

The second letter indicates the tender's water capacity. The "_M" tenders had a capacity of 4,000 imperial gallons (18,200 litres; 4,800 US gallons).

A number, when added after the letter code, indicates differences between similar tender types, such as function, wheelbase or coal bunker capacity.

== Modification ==
The original slatted upper sides of the Type XM2 tender's coal bunker were soon replaced by sheet-metal sides. Some later models of the Type XM2 tender were built new with such sheet-metal upper sides to the coal bunker. An example is the 1912 version of the tender, as delivered with the SAR Class 5 locomotives in 1912.

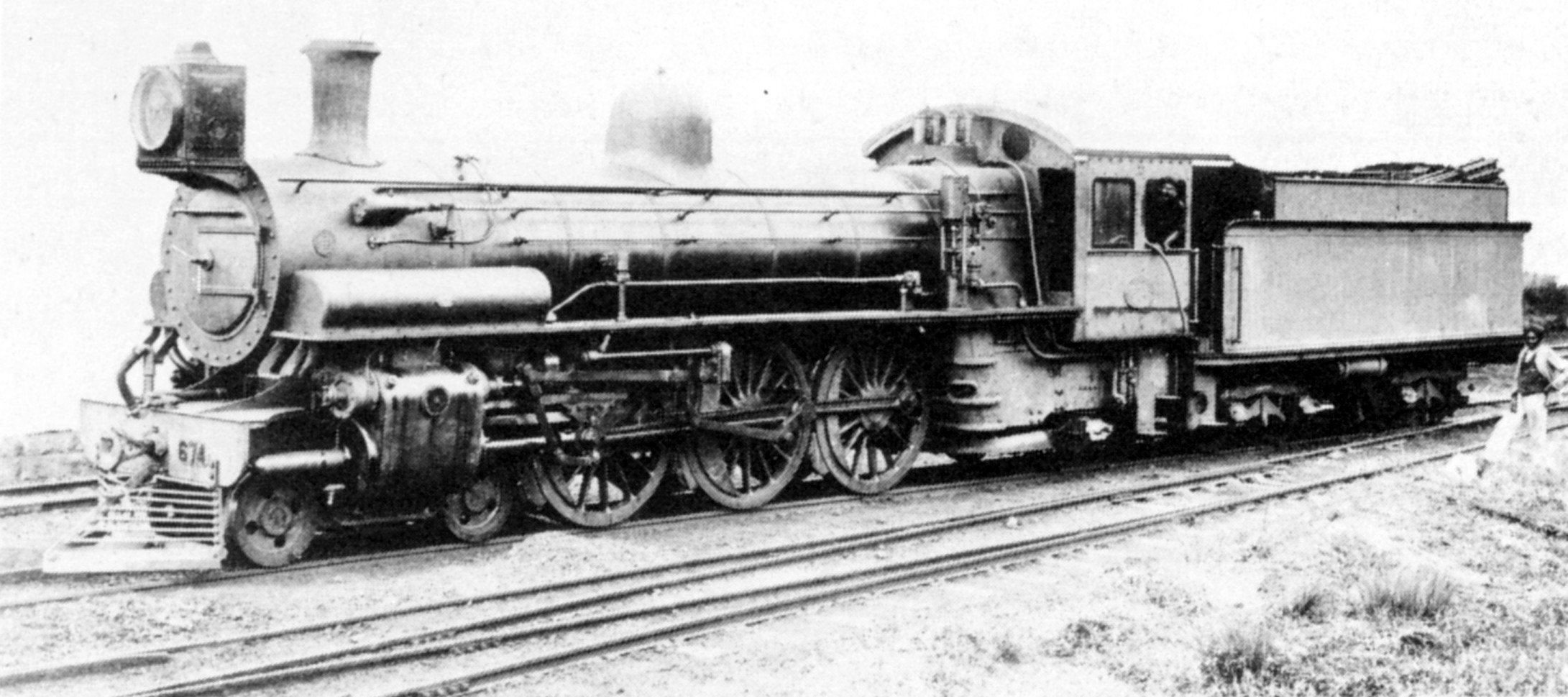
Type XM2 on CSAR Class 10-2, c. 1910

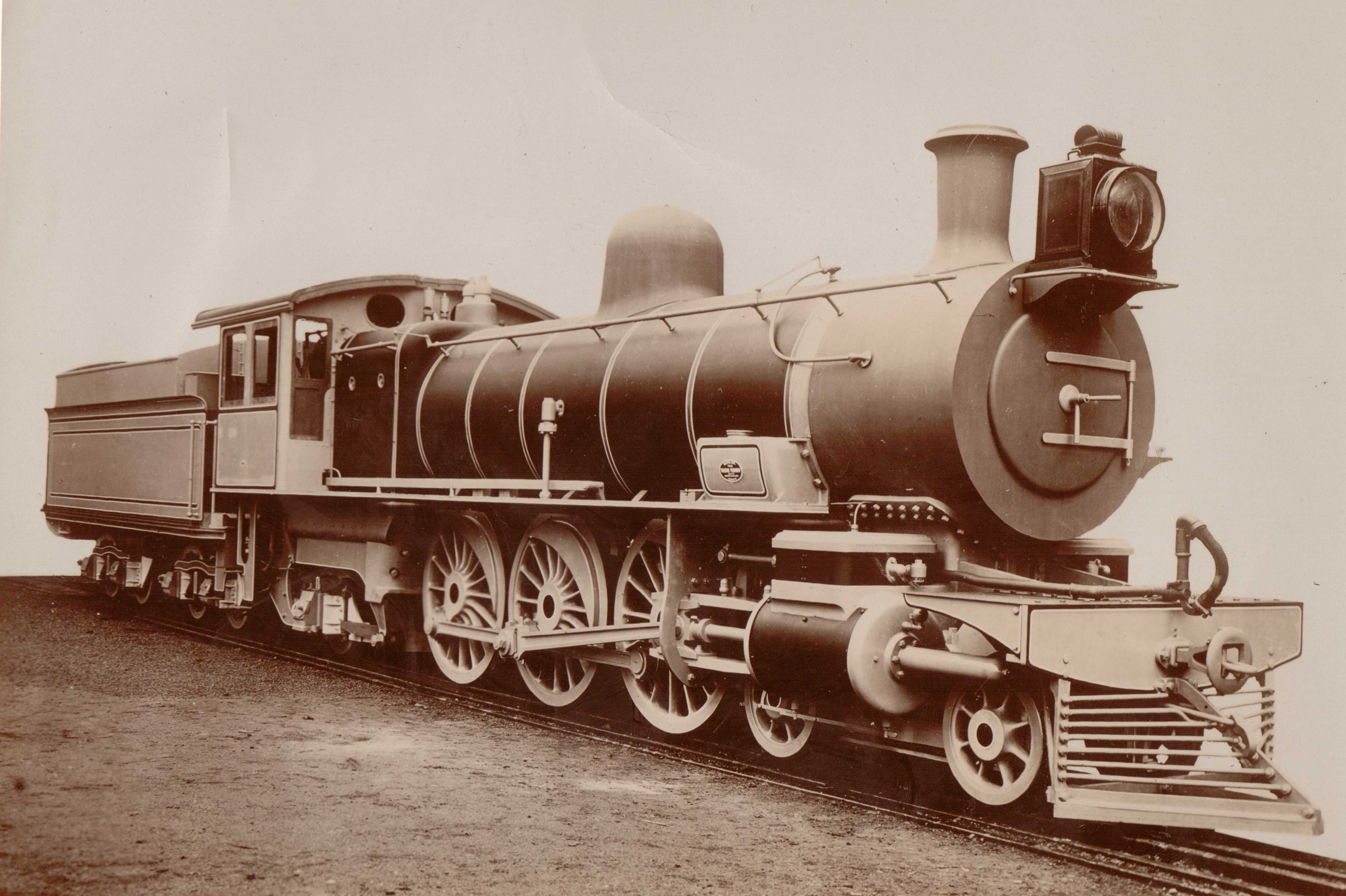
Type XM2 on SAR Class 5, c. 1912
