= South African type XM3 tender =

Steam locomotive tender in South Africa

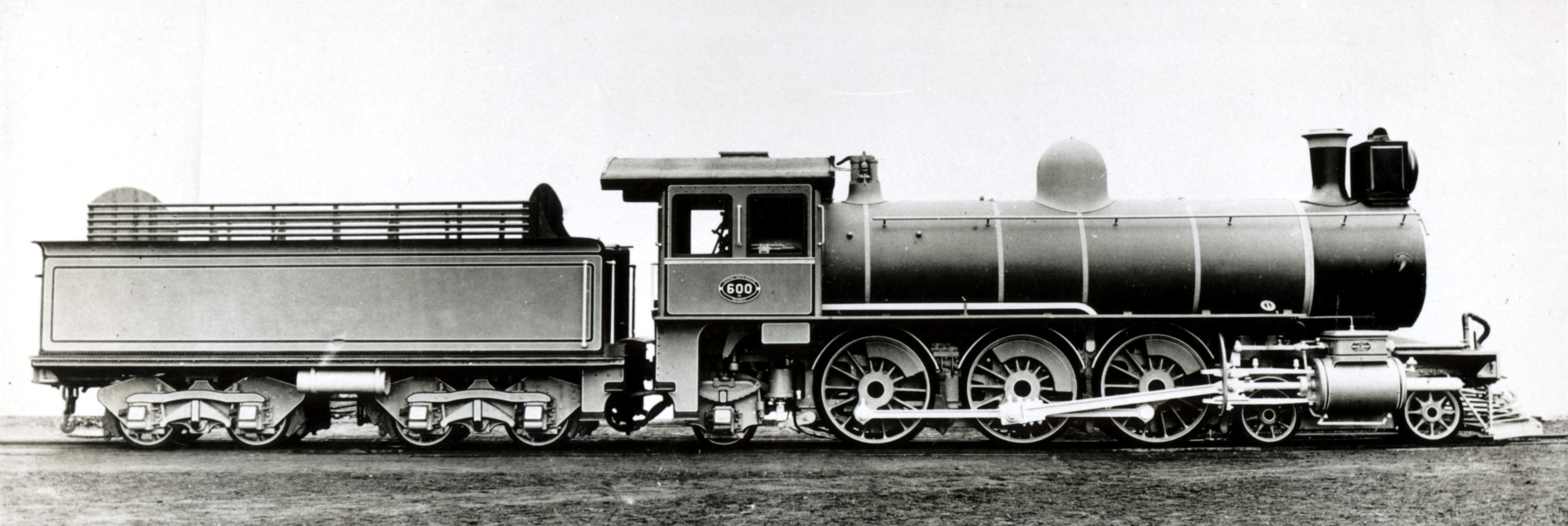
- Type XM3 tender on CSAR Class 9
Type and origin
- Locomotive: CSAR Class 9
- Designer: Central South African Railways (P.A. Hyde)
- Builder: Vulcan Foundry
- In service: 1904
Specifications
- Configuration: 2-axle bogies
- Gauge: 3 ft 6 in (1,067 mm) Cape gauge
- Length: 25 ft 10 in (7,874 mm) approx.
- Wheel dia.: 33 1/2 in (851 mm) as built 34 in (864 mm) retyred
- Wheelbase: 17 ft 3/8 in (5,191 mm)
  - Bogie: 4 ft 7 in (1,397 mm)
- Axle load: 11 LT 17 cwt 2 qtr (12,070 kg) av.
  - Bogie: 23 LT 15 cwt (24,130 kg) each
- Weight empty: 44,000 lb (20,000 kg)
- Weight w/o: 47 LT 10 cwt (48,260 kg)
- Fuel type: Coal
- Fuel cap.: 10 LT (10.2 t)
- Water cap.: 4,000 imp gal (18,200 L)
- Stoking: Manual
- Couplers: Drawbar & Johnston link-and-pin
Career
- Operators: Central South African Railways; South African Railways
- Numbers: SAR 727-731

The South African type XM3 tender was a steam locomotive tender from the pre-Union era in the Transvaal.

The Type XM3 tender entered service in 1904, as tenders to the Class 9 4-6-2 Pacific type steam locomotives which were acquired by the Central South African Railways in that year. In 1912, these locomotives retained their Class 9 designation on the South African Railways.

== Manufacturer ==
Type XM3 tenders were built by Vulcan Foundry of Newton-le-Willows in England in 1904.

The Central South African Railways (CSAR) placed five Class 9 Pacific type locomotives in service in 1904. The locomotive and tender were designed in 1903 by P.A. Hyde, who assumed the position of Chief Locomotive Superintendent of the CSAR upon its inception in July 1902.

The Type XM3 entered service as tenders to these locomotives, which were acquired to work the Durban-bound mail trains from Johannesburg as far as Charlestown on the Transvaal-Natal border.

== Characteristics ==
As built, the tender had a coal capacity of 10 long tons (10.2 tonnes) and a water capacity of 4,000 imperial gallons (18,200 litres), with a maximum average axle load of 11 long tons 17 hundredweight 2 quarters (12,070 kilograms).

== Locomotives ==
In the South African Railways (SAR) years, tenders were numbered for the engines they were delivered with. In most cases, an oval number plate, bearing the engine number and often also the tender type, would be attached to the rear end of the tender. During the classification and renumbering of locomotives onto the SAR roster in 1912, no separate classification and renumbering list was published for tenders, which should have been renumbered according to the locomotive renumbering list.

Only Class 9 locomotives were delivered new with Type XM3 tenders. Bearing in mind that tenders could and did migrate between engines, these tenders should have been numbered in the SAR number range from 727 to 731.

== Classification letters ==
Since many tender types are interchangeable between different locomotive classes and types, a tender classification system was adopted by the SAR. The first letter of the tender type indicates the classes of engines to which it could be coupled. The "X_" tenders could be used with the locomotive classes as shown.

- Cape Government Railways Mountain, SAR Class 4.
- SAR Class 4A.
- SAR Class 5.
- Cape Government Railways 6th Class of 1897, SAR Class 6B.
- Oranje-Vrijstaat Gouwerment-Spoorwegen (OVGS) 6th Class L3, SAR Class 6E.
- Cape Government Railways 6th Class of 1901 (Neilson, Reid), SAR Class 6H.
- Cape Government Railways 6th Class of 1902, SAR Class 6J.
- Cape Government Railways 8th Class of 1902, SAR Class 8.
- Imperial Military Railways (IMR) 8th Class, SAR Class 8A.
- CSAR Class 8-L2, SAR Class 8B.
- CSAR Class 8-L3, SAR Class 8C.
- Cape Government Railways 8th Class 4-8-0 of 1903, SAR Class 8D.
- Cape Government Railways 8th Class Experimental, SAR Class 8E.
- Cape Government Railways 8th Class 4-8-0 of 1904, SAR Class 8F.
- Cape Government Railways 8th Class 2-8-0 of 1903, SAR Class 8Y.
- Cape Government Railways 8th Class 2-8-0 of 1904, SAR Class 8Z.
- CSAR Class 9, SAR Class 9.
- CSAR Class 10, SAR Class 10.
- CSAR Class 10-2 Saturated, SAR Class 10A.
- CSAR Class 10-2 Superheated. SAR Class 10B.
- CSAR Class 10-C, SAR Class 10C.
- CSAR Class 11, SAR Class 11.
- Cape Government Railways 9th Class of 1903, SAR Class Experimental 4.
- Cape Government Railways 9th Class of 1906, SAR Class Experimental 5.
- Cape Government Railways 10th Class, SAR Class Experimental 6.
- SAR Class ME.
- CSAR Mallet Superheated, SAR Class MF.

The second letter indicates the tender's water capacity. The "_M" tenders had a capacity of 4,000 imperial gallons (18,200 litres; 4,800 US gallons).

A number, when added after the letter code, indicates differences between similar tender types such as function, wheelbase or coal bunker capacity.
