= South African Class 4A 4-8-2 =

1913 design of steam locomotive

South African Class 4A & 4AR 4-8-2
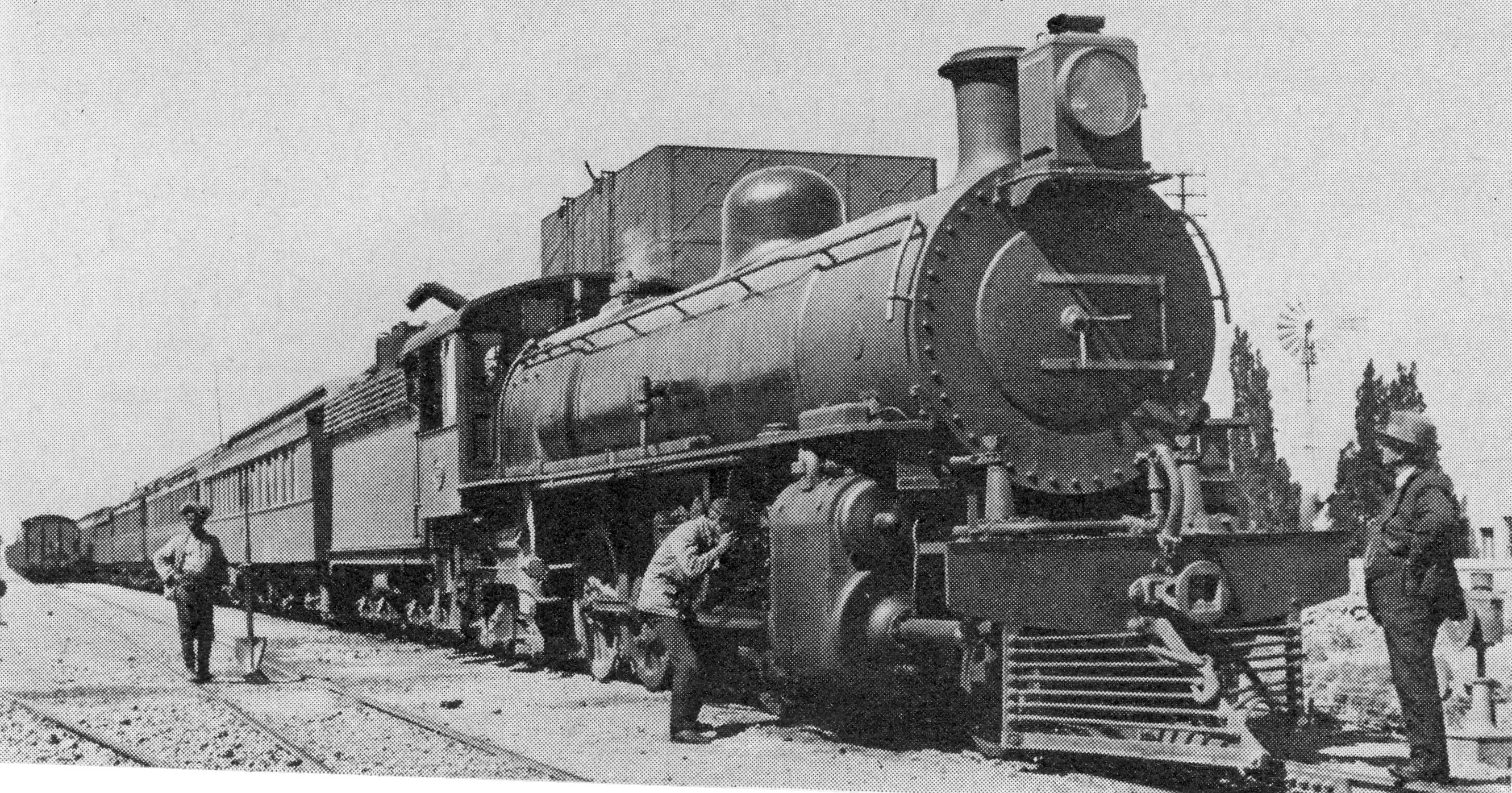
- No. 1559 at Hutchinson, Cape, 11 November 1916
Type and origin
- ♠ Class 4A as built with a round-topped firebox ♥ Class 4AR rebuilt with a Watson Standard boiler ♣ Steel firebox – ♦ Copper firebox
- Power type: Steam
- Designer: Cape Government Railways (H.M. Beatty)
- Builder: North British Locomotive Company
- Serial number: 20225-20234
- Model: CGR 4-8-2
- Build date: 1913
- Total produced: 10
Specifications
- Configuration
  - Whyte: 4-8-2 (Mountain)
  - UIC: 2'D1'h2
- Driver: 2nd coupled axle
- Gauge: 3 ft 6 in (1,067 mm) Cape gauge
- Leading dia.: 28 1/2 in (724 mm)
- Coupled dia.: 54 in (1,372 mm)
- Trailing dia.: 33 in (838 mm)
- Tender wheels: 33 1/2 in (851 mm) as built 34 in (864 mm) retyred
- Wheelbase: 58 ft 5 3/8 in (17,815 mm)
  - Axle spacing (Asymmetrical): 1-2: 4 ft 10 in (1,473 mm); 2-3: 4 ft 9 in (1,448 mm); 3-4: 4 ft 10 in (1,473 mm)
  - Engine: 32 ft 2 in (9,804 mm)
  - Leading: 6 ft 2 in (1,880 mm)
  - Coupled: 14 ft 5 in (4,394 mm)
  - Tender: 16 ft 1 in (4,902 mm)
  - Tender bogie: 4 ft 7 in (1,397 mm)
- Length
  - Over couplers: 66 ft 3 5/8 in (20,209 mm)
- Height: ♠ 12 ft 10 in (3,912 mm) ♥ 12 ft 11 1/4 in (3,943 mm)
- Frame type: Bar
- Axle load: ♠ 15 LT 12 cwt (15,850 kg) ♥ 14 LT 11 cwt (14,780 kg)
  - Leading: ♠ 12 LT (12,190 kg) ♥ 13 LT 14 cwt (13,920 kg)
  - 1st coupled: ♠ 15 LT 2 cwt (15,340 kg) ♥ 14 LT 11 cwt (14,780 kg)
  - 2nd coupled: ♠ 15 LT 12 cwt (15,850 kg) ♥ 14 LT 9 cwt (14,680 kg)
  - 3rd coupled: ♠ 15 LT 10 cwt (15,750 kg) ♥ 14 LT 7 cwt (14,580 kg)
  - 4th coupled: ♠ 15 LT 10 cwt (15,750 kg) ♥ 14 LT 4 cwt (14,430 kg)
  - Trailing: ♠ 11 LT 14 cwt (11,890 kg) ♥ 10 LT 4 cwt (10,360 kg)
  - Tender bogie: Bogie 1: 23 LT 9 cwt (23,830 kg); Bogie 2: 23 LT 16 cwt (24,180 kg)
  - Tender axle: 11 LT 18 cwt (12,090 kg)
- Adhesive weight: ♠ 61 LT 14 cwt (62,690 kg) ♥ 57 LT 11 cwt (58,470 kg)
- Loco weight: ♠ 85 LT 8 cwt (86,770 kg) ♥ 81 LT 9 cwt (82,760 kg)
- Tender weight: 47 LT 5 cwt (48,010 kg)
- Total weight: ♠ 132 LT 13 cwt (134,800 kg) ♥ 128 LT 14 cwt (130,800 kg)
- Tender type: XM (2-axle bogies); XC, XC1, XD, XE, XE1, XF, XF1, XF2, XJ, XM, XM1, XM2, XM3, XM4, XP1, XS permitted
- Fuel type: Coal
- Fuel capacity: 8 LT (8.1 t)
- Water cap.: 4,000 imp gal (18,200 L)
- Firebox
  - Type: Round-top, combustion chamber
  - Grate area: ♠♥ 37 sq ft (3.4 m^{2})
- Boiler
  - Model: ♥ Watson Standard no. 2
  - Pitch: ♠ 7 ft 6 in (2,286 mm) ♥ 8 ft (2,438 mm)
  - Diameter: ♠ 5 ft 6 3/8 in (1,686 mm) ♥ 5 ft 7 1/2 in (1,714 mm)
  - Tube plates: ♠ 18 ft 3 in (5,563 mm) ♥♣ 19 ft 4 in (5,893 mm) ♥♦ 19 ft 3 5/8 in (5,883 mm)
  - Small tubes: ♠ 144: 2 1/4 in (57 mm) ♥ 81: 2 1/2 in (64 mm)
  - Large tubes: ♠ 22: 5 3/8 in (137 mm) ♥ 30: 5 1/2 in (140 mm)
- Boiler pressure: 180 psi (1,241 kPa)
- Safety valve: Cole's Pop
- Heating surface
  - Firebox: ♠ 186 sq ft (17.3 m^{2}) ♥ 142 sq ft (13.2 m^{2})
  - Tubes: ♠ 2,106 sq ft (195.7 m^{2}) ♥ 1,933 sq ft (179.6 m^{2})
  - Total surface: ♠ 2,292 sq ft (212.9 m^{2}) ♥ 2,075 sq ft (192.8 m^{2})
- Superheater
  - Heating area: ♠ 554 sq ft (51.5 m^{2}) ♥ 497 sq ft (46.2 m^{2})
- Cylinders: Two
- Cylinder size: 21 1/2 in (546 mm) bore 28 in (711 mm) stroke
- Valve gear: Walschaerts
- Valve type: Piston
- Couplers: Johnston link-and-pin AAR knuckle (1930s)
Performance figures
- Tractive effort: ♠♥ 32,360 lbf (143.9 kN) @ 75%
Career
- Operators: South African Railways
- Class: Class 4A, Class 4AR
- Number in class: 10
- Numbers: 1551–1560
- Delivered: 1913–1914
- First run: 1913
- Withdrawn: 1974
- The leading coupled axle had flangeless wheels

The South African Railways Class 4A 4-8-2 of 1913 was a steam locomotive.

In 1913 and 1914, ten Class 4A steam locomotives with a 4-8-2 Mountain type wheel arrangement were placed in service by the South African Railways.

== Manufacturer ==
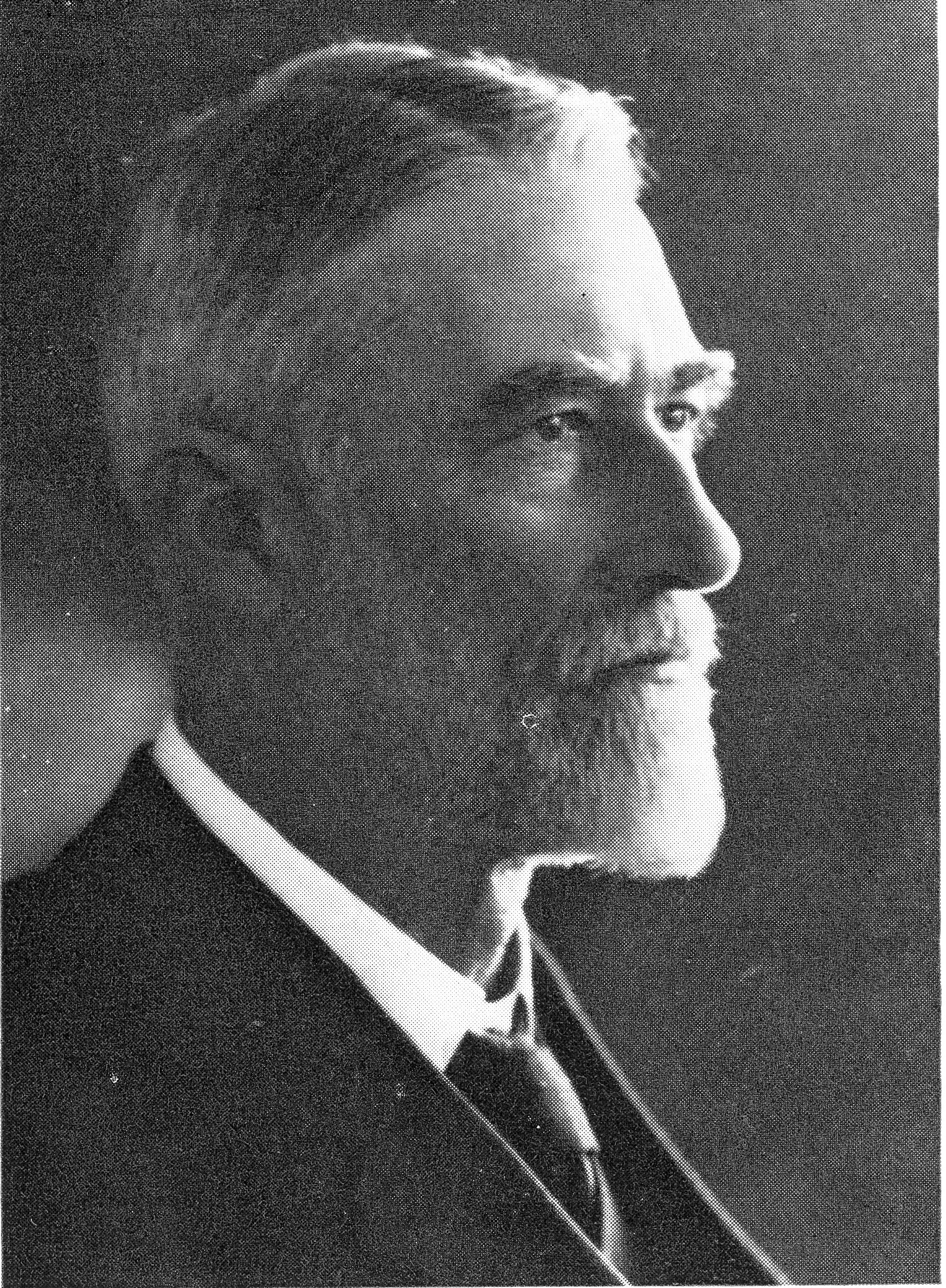
H.M. Beatty

The Class 4 Mountain type locomotive was designed at the Salt River shops as a heavy mixed traffic locomotive by H.M. Beatty, the last Chief Locomotive Superintendent of the Cape Government Railways (CGR).

Soon after the South African Railways (SAR) locomotive renumbering and classification scheme was carried out in 1912, an order was placed with North British Locomotive Company for a further ten locomotives of this type, built to an altered design. They were delivered late in 1913 and were designated Class 4A, numbered in the range from 1551 to 1560.

== Characteristics ==
The Class 4A locomotive was an improved version of the predecessor Class 4. It had a superheater added, which further resulted in the slide valves and Stephenson valve gear having to be replaced with piston valves and Walschaerts valve gear. The boilers were similar to those of the Class 4, except for the superheater and the length between tube-plates, which was 3 inches (76 millimetres) longer. The bar frames were identical to that of the Class 4, but the cylinders were of a 1 inch (25 millimetres) larger bore. The engines were erected at the Salt River shops in Cape Town during November 1913. Like their two forerunners, they were excellent steamers and, with the design alterations, gave a much better performance.

The Class 4A were the only locomotives to be delivered with Type XM tenders, which had a coal capacity of 8 long tons (8.1 tonnes) and a water capacity of 4,000 imperial gallons (18,200 litres).

The locomotive was the prototype for the Rhodesia Railways 10th Class, a scaled-down version that, like the Class 4A, gave long service.

== Watson Standard boilers ==
In the 1930s, many serving locomotives were reboilered with a standard boiler type designed by then Chief Mechanical Engineer A.G. Watson as part of his standardisation policy. Such Watson Standard reboilered locomotives were reclassified by adding an "R" suffix to their classification.

All ten Class 4A locomotives were reboilered with Watson Standard no. 2 boilers during 1935 and reclassified to Class 4AR. No. 1554 was the first to be so modified and retained its original cab, which was cut back to accommodate the new boiler and wash-out plugs. It also initially retained its original cowcatcher. The other nine locomotives all had new Watson cabs fitted during reboilering, with their distinctive slanted fronts compared to the conventional vertical fronts of their original cabs.

The new boiler's pitch was 6 inches (152 millimetres) higher than on the Class 4A. In the process the locomotives underwent some additional modifications. The trailing bissel truck remained unaltered, but the side control was redesigned and spring compensation was extended to include the bissel. This was one of the rare instances where reboilering actually appreciably reduced the total weight of the engine, from 85 long tons 8 hundredweight (86,770 kilograms) to 81 long tons 9 hundredweight (82,760 kilograms).

An obvious visual difference between an original and a Watson Standard reboilered locomotive is usually a rectangular regulator cover, just to the rear of the chimney on the reboilered locomotive, but this was not always the case, as illustrated. A more obvious difference in the case of the Class 4AR is the top-fed feedwater supply to the boiler.

== Service ==
Their first ten years of service were spent working both passenger and goods trains on various sections of the Cape mainline. At first they worked out of Cape Town, but when more powerful locomotives became available, they were transferred to the Karoo, working between Touws River and Kimberley and also northward from Kimberley to Mafeking. They were then transferred to the Reef, from where they regularly served on the Zeerust, Breyten and Volksrust lines while also being employed in a variety of suburban and local train workings.

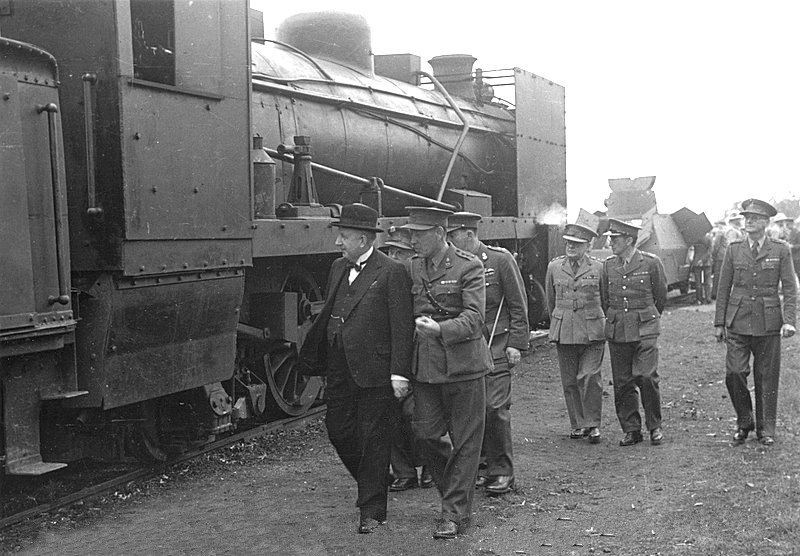
Armoured Class 4AR no. 1554, 1942

During the Second World War, Class 4A no. 1554 was equipped with temporary protective armour to serve as the locomotive of an armoured train. The locomotive and train were stationed at Mapleton Camp of the Union Defence Force, where the SAR&H Brigade trained before going north to the Middle East.

Armoured boiler cladding was added. The cab, front and sides of the smokebox were enclosed and some fittings on top of the boiler and firebox such as the safety valves and top feed were boxed in armour. Armour plating was also fitted to the sides of the running boards. The picture shows the locomotive and armoured train being inspected during 1942 by the Honourable F. C. Sturrock MP, South Africa's Minister of Transport at the time.

The last Class 4AR locomotive was withdrawn from shunting operations on the West Rand in 1974 after more than 60 years in service. Some remained working in industrial service for several more years, with the last one being finally retired from Apex Colliery in 1983.

== Rhodesia Railways ==
A lighter version of the Class 4A was built by NBL for the Rhodesia Railways (RR). It was designated the RR 10th Class and was used on the long section south from Bulawayo in Southern Rhodesia through Bechuanaland Protectorate to Mafeking in the Cape Province.

Like the SAR Class 4A, the RR 10th Class had combustion chambers, the only RR locomotive class with this feature.

== Preservation ==
Two of these engines survive.

Number	Works nmr	THF / Private	Leaselend / Owner	Current Location	Outside South Africa	?
1555	NBL / 20229	THF	MUSEUM	Bloemfontein Locomotive Depot		
1560	NBL / 20233	THF		Queenstown Locomotive Depot		

== Illustration ==
The main picture shows no. 1559, as built, on the Cape Town-Johannesburg train, taking water at Hutchinson in the Karoo on 11 November 1916.

In the pictures of reboilered Class 4AR locomotives, one locomotive has the rectangular regulator cover just to the rear of the chimney, while the other, no. 1554, has a bolted on cover plate instead, flush with the boiler cladding. Both have Watson cabs, while the pictures of Class 4A locomotives show their original cabs with conventional vertical fronts.

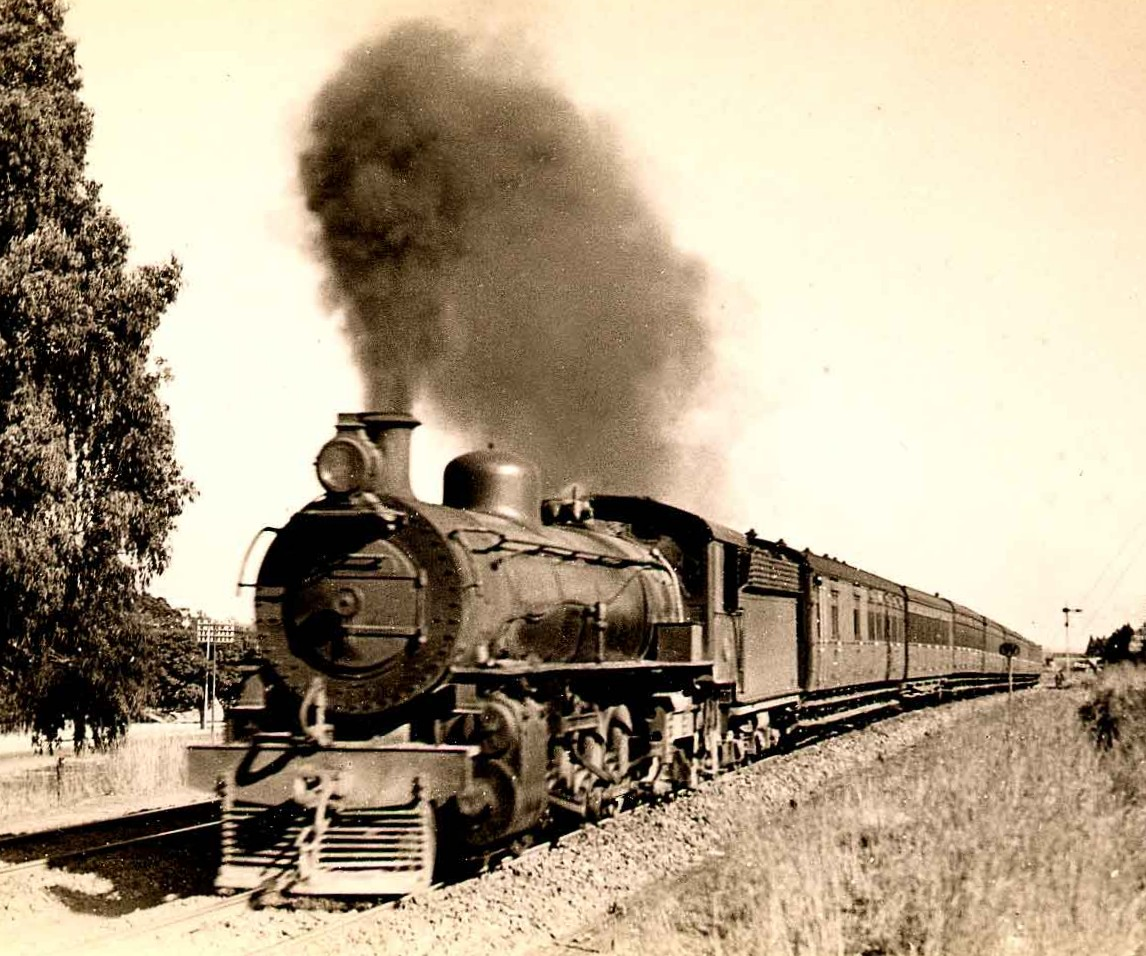
Class 4A on a local between Langlaagte and Mayfair, c. 1930

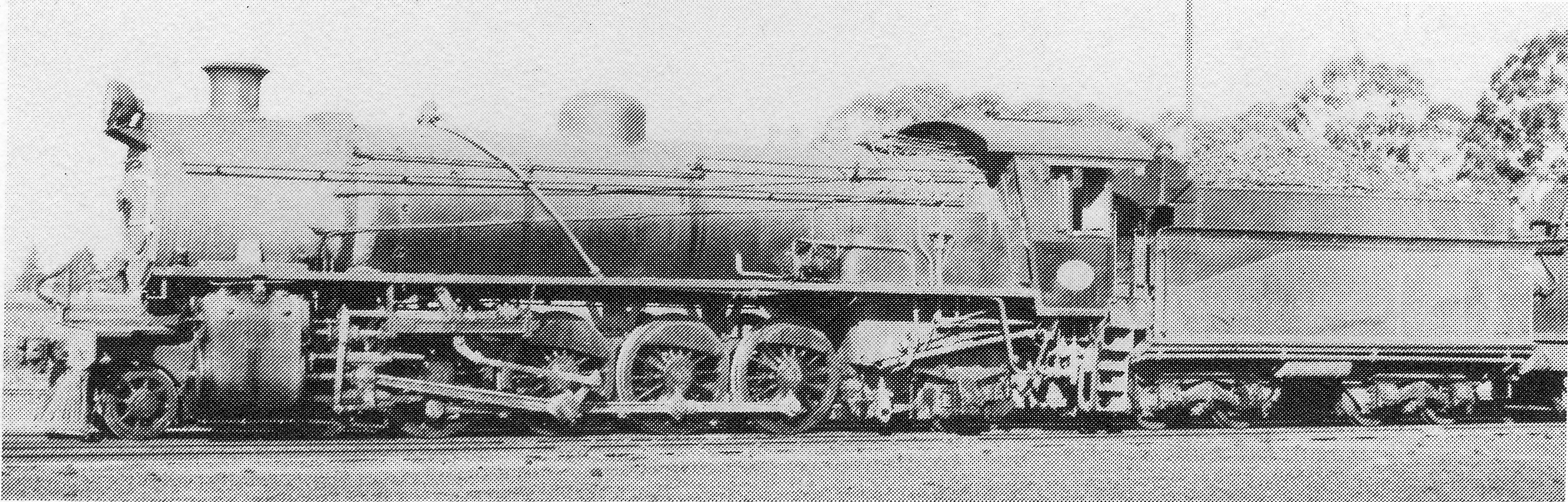
Reboilered Class 4AR with the rectangular regulator cover and a Watson cab with its slanted front, c. 1970

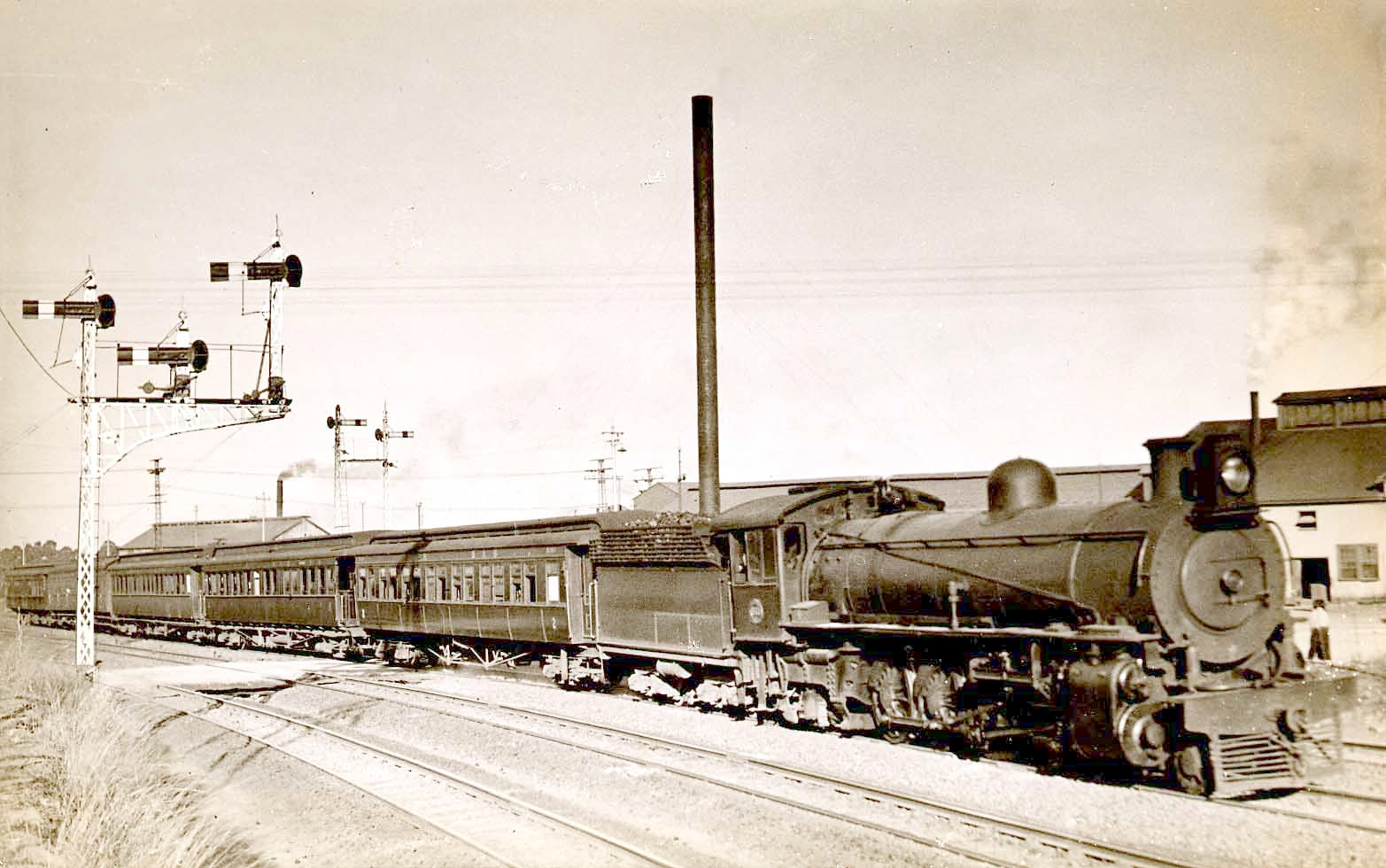
Class 4A at Driehoek at Simmer & Jack's mine with a passenger train from Breyten, c. 1930

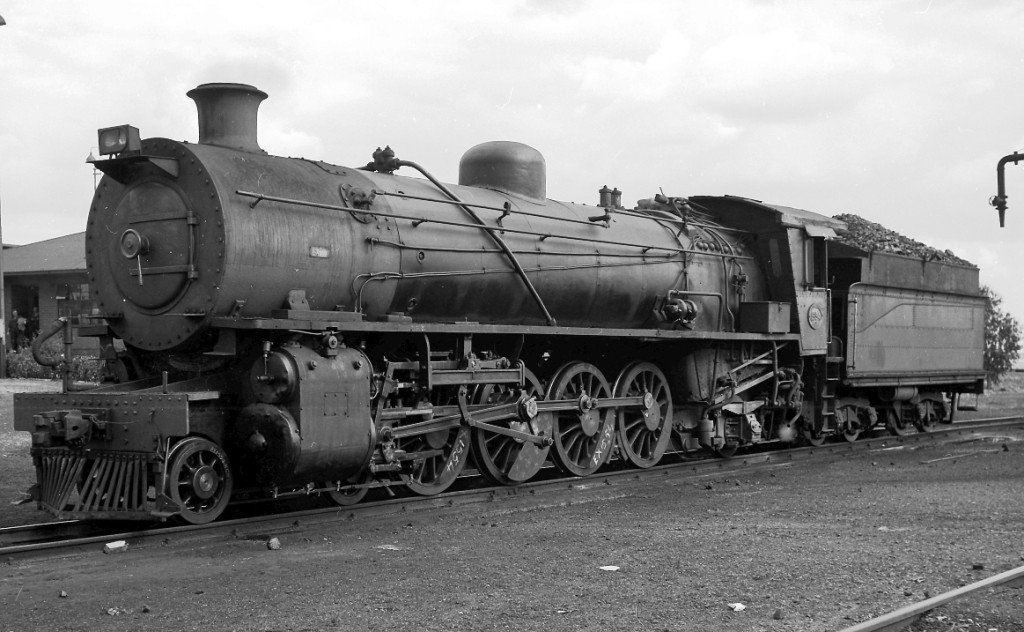
Class 4AR no. 1554 with its modified cab, a flush regulator cover, a modified buffer beam and standard cowcatcher, 8 April 1966
