= South African Class 10B 4-6-2 =

1910 design of steam locomotive

CSAR Class 10-2 4-6-2 Superheated South African Class 10B & 10BR 4-6-2
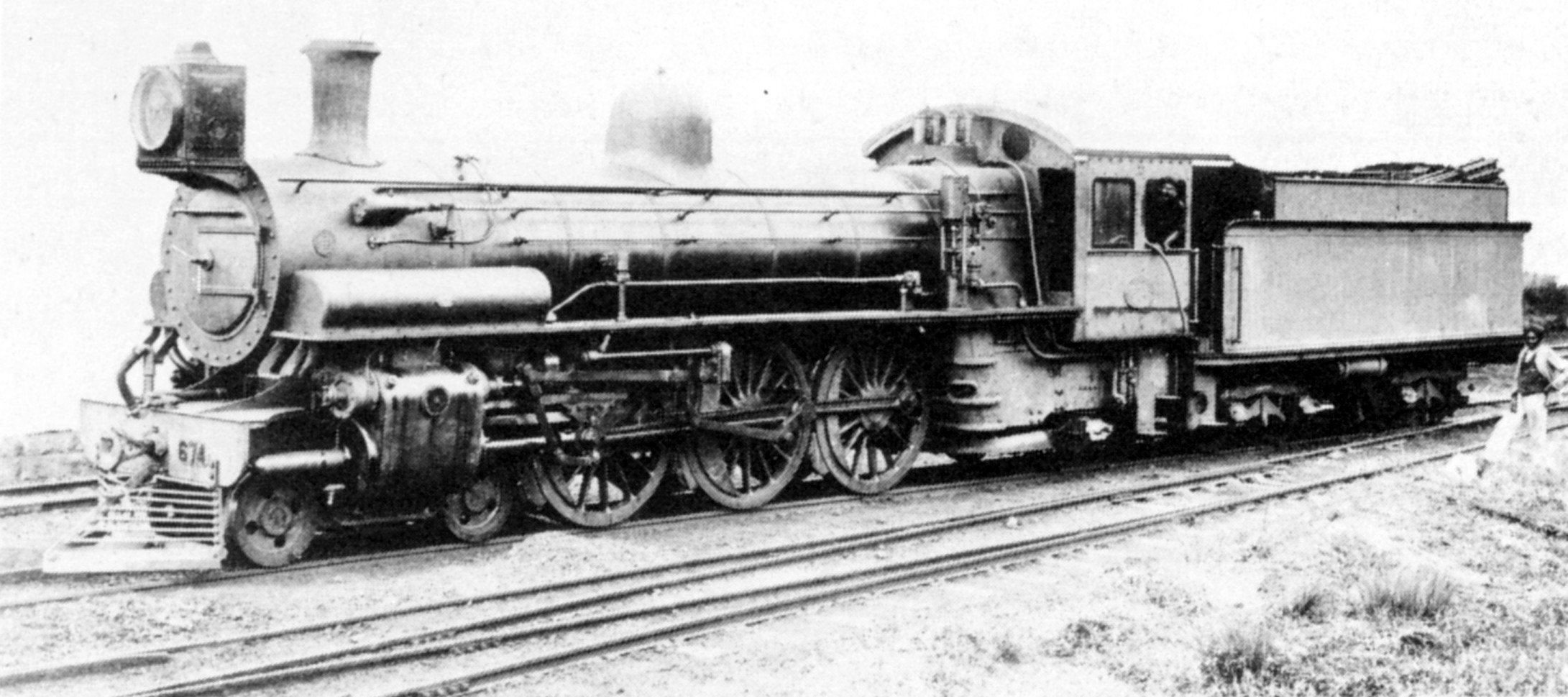
- Class 10B no. 756, ex CSAR Class 10-2 no. 674
Type and origin
- ♠ Class 10B as built with a Belpaire firebox ♥ Class 10BR rebuilt with a Watson Standard boiler
- Power type: Steam
- Designer: Central South African Railways (G.G. Elliot)
- Builder: North British Locomotive Company; Beyer, Peacock & Company
- Order number: BP 0268
- Serial number: NBL 18976-18980; BP 5483-5487
- Model: CSAR Class 10-2
- Build date: 1910–1911
- Total produced: 10
Specifications
- Configuration
  - Whyte: 4-6-2
- Driver: 2nd coupled axle
- Gauge: 3 ft 6 in (1,067 mm) Cape gauge
- Leading dia.: 28 1/2 in (724 mm)
- Coupled dia.: 62 in (1,575 mm)
- Trailing dia.: 33 in (838 mm)
- Tender wheels: 34 in (864 mm)
- Wheelbase: 55 ft 8 in (16,967 mm)
  - Engine: 30 ft 2 in (9,195 mm)
  - Leading: 6 ft (1,829 mm)
  - Coupled: 10 ft 10 in (3,302 mm)
  - Tender: 16 ft 9 in (5,105 mm)
  - Tender bogie: 4 ft 7 in (1,397 mm)
- Length
  - Over couplers: 63 ft 10 3/4 in (19,475 mm)
- Height: ♠ 12 ft 10 in (3,912 mm) ♥ 12 ft 11 in (3,937 mm)
- Frame type: Plate
- Axle load: ♠ 15 LT 14 cwt (15,950 kg) ♥ 16 LT 8 cwt (16,660 kg)
  - Leading: ♠ 14 LT 16 cwt (15,040 kg) ♥ 15 LT 6 cwt (15,550 kg)
  - 1st coupled: ♠ 15 LT 12 cwt (15,850 kg) ♥ 15 LT 9 cwt (15,700 kg)
  - 2nd coupled: ♠ 15 LT 14 cwt (15,950 kg) ♥ 16 LT 6 cwt (16,560 kg)
  - 3rd coupled: ♠ 15 LT 14 cwt (15,950 kg) ♥ 16 LT 8 cwt (16,660 kg)
  - Trailing: ♠ 12 LT 13 cwt (12,850 kg) ♥ 13 LT 11 cwt (13,770 kg)
  - Tender bogie: Bogie 1: 24 LT 4 cwt (24,590 kg); Bogie 2: 25 LT 3 cwt (25,550 kg)
  - Tender axle: 12 LT 11 cwt 2 qtr (12,780 kg)
- Adhesive weight: ♠ 47 LT (47,750 kg) ♥ 48 LT 3 cwt (48,920 kg)
- Loco weight: ♠ 74 LT 9 cwt (75,640 kg) ♥ 76 LT 2 cwt (77,320 kg)
- Tender weight: 49 LT 7 cwt (50,140 kg)
- Total weight: ♠ 123 LT 16 cwt (125,800 kg) ♥ 125 LT 9 cwt (127,500 kg)
- Tender type: XM2 (2-axle bogies); XC, XC1, XD, XE, XE1, XF, XF1, XF2, XJ, XM, XM1, XM2, XM3, XM4, XP1, XS permitted
- Fuel type: Coal
- Fuel capacity: 10 LT (10.2 t)
- Water cap.: 4,000 imp gal (18,200 L)
- Generator: Pyle National Turbo
- Firebox
  - Type: ♠ Belpaire – ♥ Round-top
  - Grate area: ♠ 35 sq ft (3.3 m^{2}) ♥ 36 sq ft (3.3 m^{2})
- Boiler
  - Model: ♥ Watson Standard no. 1
  - Pitch: ♠ 7 ft 4 in (2,235 mm) ♥ 8 ft (2,438 mm)
  - Diameter: ♠ 4 ft 6 3/4 in (1,391 mm) ♥ 5 ft (1,524 mm)
  - Tube plates: ♠ 18 ft 6 1/2 in (5,652 mm) ♥ 17 ft 9 in (5,410 mm)
  - Small tubes: ♠ 92: 2 1/4 in (57 mm) ♥ 76: 2 1/2 in (64 mm)
  - Large tubes: ♠ 18: 5 1/4 in (133 mm) ♥ 24: 5 1/2 in (140 mm)
- Boiler pressure: ♠♥ 180 psi (1,241 kPa)
- Safety valve: ♠ Ramsbottom ♥ Pop
- Feedwater heater: Trevithick exhaust steam type
- Heating surface
  - Firebox: ♠ 125 sq ft (11.6 m^{2}) ♥ 123 sq ft (11.4 m^{2})
  - Tubes: ♠ 1,463 sq ft (135.9 m^{2}) ♥ 1,497 sq ft (139.1 m^{2})
  - Total surface: ♠ 1,588 sq ft (147.5 m^{2}) ♥ 1,620 sq ft (151 m^{2})
- Superheater
  - Type: Schmidt
  - Heating area: ♠ 384 sq ft (35.675 m^{2}) ♥ 366 sq ft (34.003 m^{2})
- Cylinders: Two
- Cylinder size: ♠♥ 20 in (508 mm) bore ♠♥ 28 in (711 mm) stroke
- Valve gear: Walschaerts
- Valve type: Piston
- Couplers: Johnston link-and-pin AAR knuckle (1930s)
Performance figures
- Tractive effort: ♠♥ 24,390 lbf (108.5 kN) @ 75%
Career
- Operators: Central South African Railways; South African Railways
- Class: CSAR Class 10-2; SAR Class 10B & 10BR
- Number in class: 10
- Numbers: CSAR 670-674 (NBL); SAR 752-761 (NBL & BP)
- Delivered: 1910–1912
- First run: 1910
- Withdrawn: 1974
- The 2nd coupled axle had flangeless wheels

The South African Railways Class 10B of 1910 was a class of 4-6-2 steam locomotives from the pre-Union era in Transvaal.

In March 1910, the Central South African Railways placed ten Class 10-2 steam locomotives with a 4-6-2 Pacific wheel arrangement in service, of which five were built with and five without superheaters. In 1912, when the five superheated locomotives were assimilated into the South African Railways, they were renumbered and designated Class 10B. During 1912, the South African Railways placed five more Class 10B locomotives in service.

== Manufacturers ==
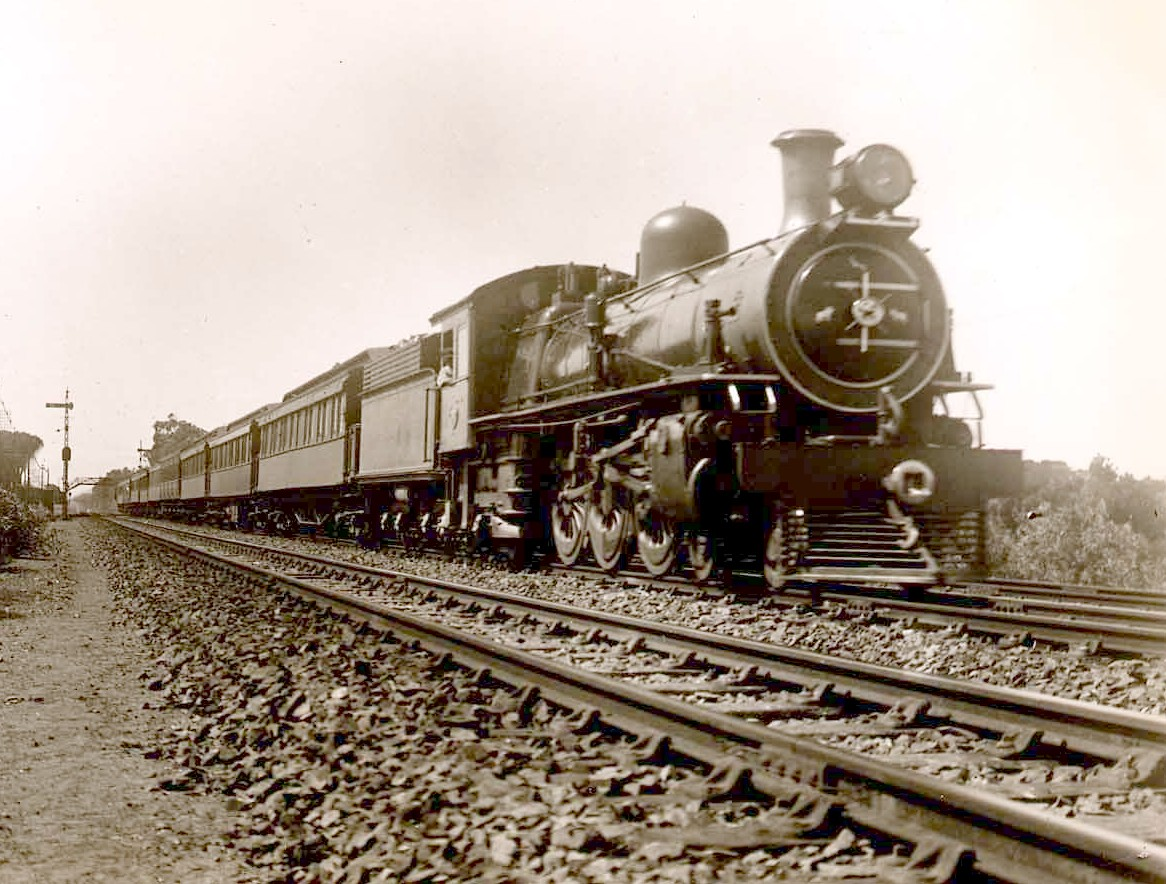
Belpaire firebox Class 10B on a passenger train, c. 1930

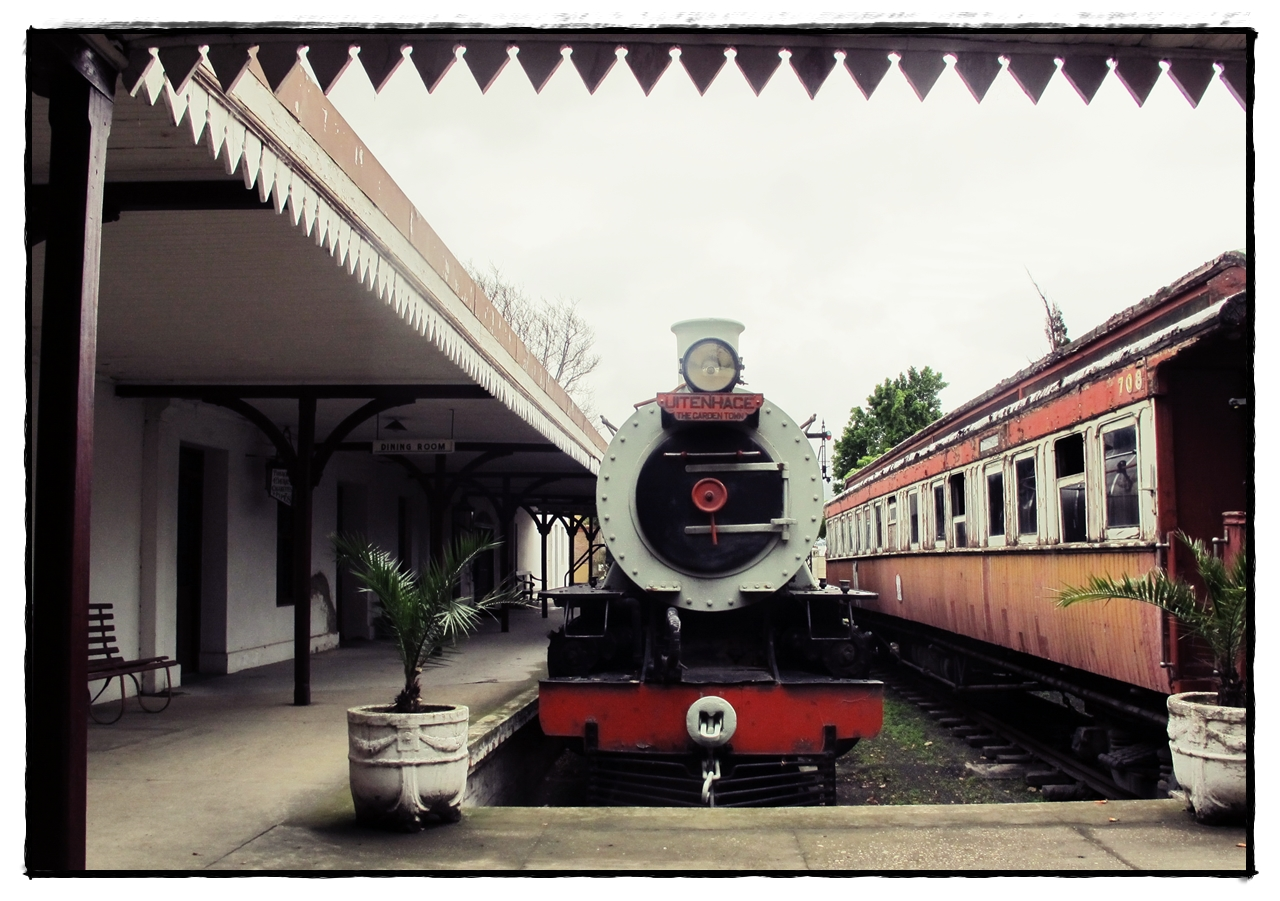
Class 10BR no. 758 at the Old Uitenhage Station Museum

Ten heavy 4-6-2 passenger locomotives, designed by Central South African Railways (CSAR) Chief Mechanical Engineer G.G. Elliot and based on the Class 10 design of his predecessor, CSAR Chief Locomotive Superintendent P.A. Hyde, were ordered from the North British Locomotive Company and delivered in 1910. They had plate frames, Belpaire fireboxes and Walschaerts valve gear and were delivered in two variants, with five of them using saturated steam while the rest were superheated with Schmidt type superheaters. They were all designated Class 10-2 by the CSAR, numbered in the range from 665 to 674, and entered service in March 1910.

== Characteristics ==
The Class 10-2 superheated locomotives were similar to the Class 10, except that their boilers were arranged 7 7/8 inches (200 millimetres) further forward and their firebox throats and back plates were sloped instead of being vertical. This modification brought the chimney in line with the cylinders and avoided a "set" in the blastpipe. The cylinders were arranged outside the plate frames. Like the Class 10, the locomotives had 62 inches (1,575 millimetres) diameter coupled wheels, the largest yet used in South Africa at the time.

The Walschaerts valve gear was controlled by a vertical type of steam reversing engine which was attached to the right-hand side of the boiler, just below the dome. It consisted of a 5 1/2 inches (140 millimetres) diameter steam cylinder and a 4 inches (102 millimetres) diameter oil cylinder, fitted with a common piston rod with a crosshead which was machined integral with the piston rod. This crosshead was connected to a lever fitted to the reversing shaft. After 1912, these reversing engines were replaced with Hendrie steam reversers.

While the Class 10 had outside admission valves, the Class 10-2 superheated used inside admission piston valves. Two Trevithick exhaust steam feedwater heaters were mounted on the running boards on either side of the smokebox above the cylinders and a Weir's feedwater pump was mounted on the left-hand side of the firebox. Each feedwater heater cylinder was 1 foot 2 1/2 inches (368 millimetres) external diameter and 5 feet 4 inches (1,626 millimetres) between tube plates, and contained 108 3/4 inch (19 millimetres) external diameter brass tubes. The feedwater heaters and the feedwater pump were removed after a few years, since the feedwater heater tubes proved to be troublesome to clean.

A Wakefield mechanical-feed lubricator was arranged on the right-hand side running board and was operated through a lever and crank, actuated from the crosshead. Mechanical lubricators had the advantage that the rate of oil-feed was always proportional to the speed of the engine. This type of oil-feed was later superseded for the sight-feed lubricator.

The engines were fitted with the Flaman speed recorder, of which the driving gear was connected to the right trailing crank pin. The records obtained from these indicators were of considerable value when operating fast passenger services. The sand boxes were arranged in front of the leading coupled wheels and fitted with steam sanding gear, which was later found to be an unnecessary refinement for South African conditions.

== Schmidt superheater ==
The Schmidt type superheater consisted of a series of elements in eighteen 5 1/4 inches (133 millimetres) external diameter flue tubes, arranged in three rows. These elements were connected to a superheater header, fitted in the upper portion of the smokebox. The flue tubes were expanded into the firebox and smokebox tube plates in a special manner which was subsequently found to be unnecessary. Each tube contained a superheater element consisting of four 1 1/4 inches (32 millimetres) diameter steam tubes.

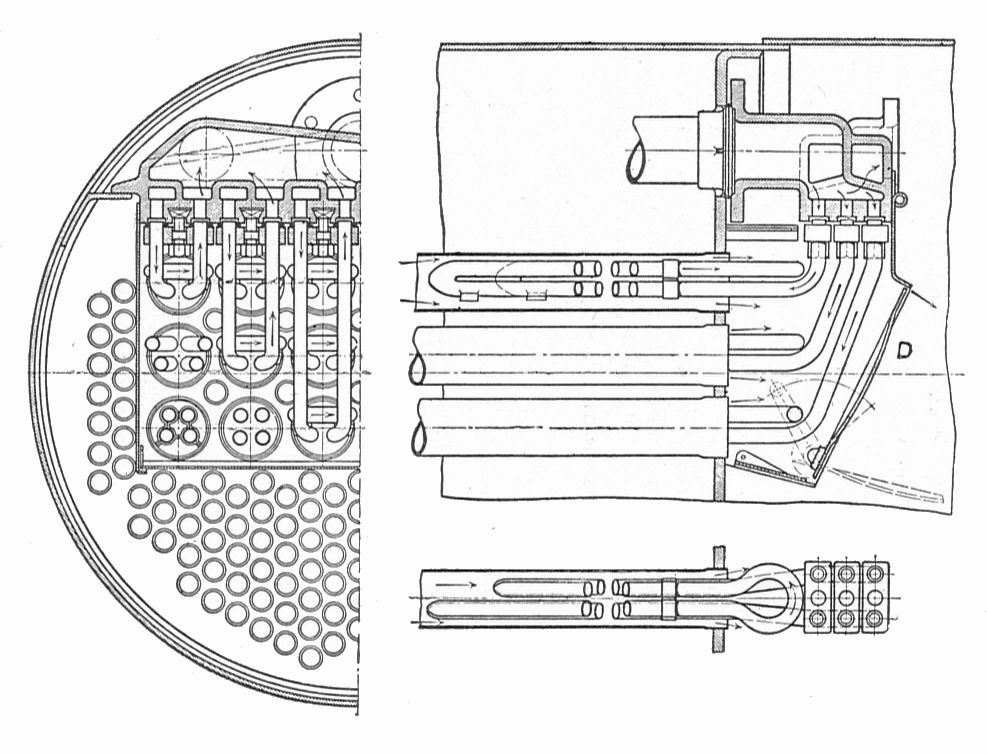
Schmidt superheater

The construction of the header and its connections to the steam pipe and steam chest were such that steam had to pass through the elements on its way from the boiler to the cylinders. The flow of heat through the large superheater flue tubes was controlled by damper doors (marked "D" in the diagram), hinged or pivoted below the header in the smokebox. The damper doors were actuated by a small automatic steam cylinder and piston attached to the outer shell of the smokebox. While the regulator was shut, the dampers were kept closed by a counterweight fitted to a crank. When steam was admitted, the dampers were immediately opened simultaneously. The dampers could also be manually operated from the footplate, independently of the automatic cylinder.

The primary reason for dampers was to prevent the elements from possible overheating and damage while the regulator was closed. Once experience showed these precautions to be unnecessary, all such dampers were discarded.

In service, it was found that the superheated locomotives could handle almost 25% more load than their saturated steam sister engines, so much so that double-heading of passenger trains in the Orange Free State became unnecessary with the Class 10-2 superheated locomotive.

== South African Railways ==
When the Union of South Africa was established on 31 May 1910, the three Colonial government railways (Cape Government Railways, Natal Government Railways and CSAR) were united under a single administration to control and administer the railways, ports and harbours of the Union. Although the South African Railways and Harbours came into existence in 1910, the actual classification and renumbering of all the rolling stock of the three constituent railways were only implemented with effect from 1 January 1912.

When they were assimilated into the South African Railways (SAR) in 1912, the five saturated steam locomotives were designated Class 10A, while the five superheated steam locomotives, numbered in the range from 670 to 674, were designated Class 10B and renumbered in the range from 752 to 756.

During 1911, the CSAR had ordered a further five superheated Class 10B locomotives from Beyer, Peacock & Company. These were delivered to the SAR in January 1912 and numbered in the range from 757 to 761. The engine numbers of these five were out of sequence with their builder's works numbers.

Unlike the earlier engines, these last five locomotives were built without feedwater heaters. Their Pyle National Turbo-generators were arranged on top of the last boiler barrel course instead of in front of the chimney and behind the headlight.

== Watson standard boilers ==
During the 1930s, many serving locomotives were reboilered with a standard round-topped boiler type designed by then Chief Mechanical Engineer A.G. Watson as part of his standardisation policy. Such Watson Standard reboilered locomotives were reclassified by adding an "R" suffix to their classification letter.

Five of the Class 10B locomotives were eventually reboilered with Watson Standard no. 1 boilers and reclassified to Class 10BR. In the process, their boiler pitch was raised by 8 inches (203 millimetres). Fitting them with the new boilers required minimal modifications, such as fitting a new cab front. At the same time, the steps leading to the cab were removed from the tender and attached to the engine.

Their original Belpaire boilers were fitted with Ramsbottom safety valves, while the Watson Standard boiler was fitted with Pop safety valves. An obvious difference between an original and a Watson Standard reboilered locomotive is usually a rectangular regulator cover, just to the rear of the chimney on the reboilered locomotive. In the case of the Class 10BR locomotives, an even more obvious difference was the absence of the Belpaire firebox hump between the cab and boiler on the reboilered locomotives.

The table lists the locomotive builders, works numbers, CSAR to SAR renumbering and the Watson Standard boiler reclassification for the Class 10B and 10BR locomotives.

Class 10B & 10BR 4-6-2 Builders, Works Numbers & Renumbering
| Builder | Year | Works No. | CSAR No. | SAR No. | Class |
|---|---|---|---|---|---|
| North British Locomotive Company | 1910 | 18976 | 670 | 752 | 10B |
| North British Locomotive Company | 1910 | 18977 | 671 | 753 | 10BR |
| North British Locomotive Company | 1910 | 18978 | 672 | 754 | 10BR |
| North British Locomotive Company | 1910 | 18979 | 673 | 755 | 10B |
| North British Locomotive Company | 1910 | 18980 | 674 | 756 | 10BR |
| Beyer, Peacock & Company | 1911 | 5483 | | 757 | 10B |
| Beyer, Peacock & Company | 1911 | 5484 | | 758 | 10BR |
| Beyer, Peacock & Company | 1911 | 5486 | | 759 | 10BR |
| Beyer, Peacock & Company | 1911 | 5487 | | 760 | 10B |
| Beyer, Peacock & Company | 1911 | 5485 | | 761 | 10B |

== Service ==
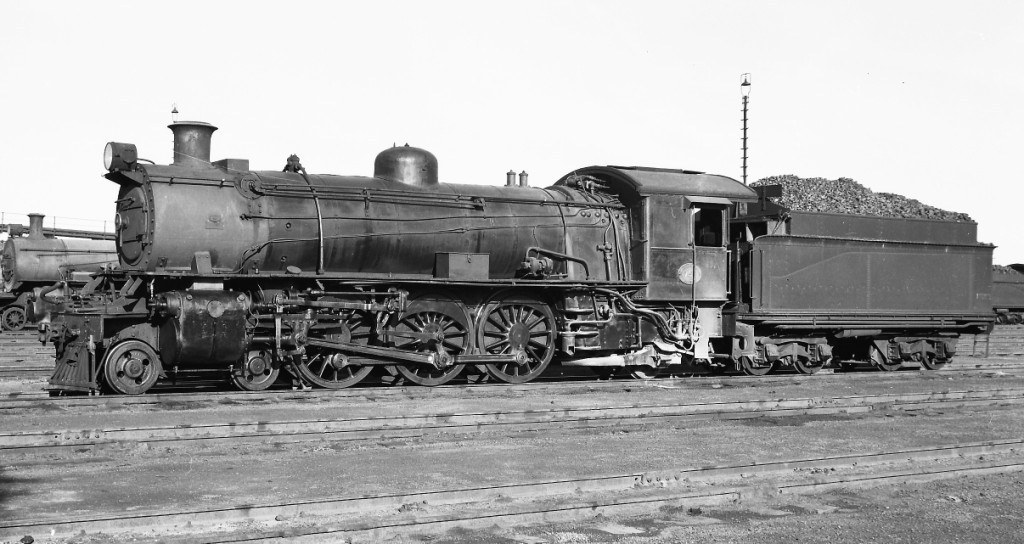
SAR Class 10BR 751 (4-6-2)

The Class 10B was placed in service to haul passenger trains out of Johannesburg. On the fast trains running between Pretoria and Johannesburg, the scheduled time of 1 hour 15 minutes was maintained daily and the 36 miles 28 chains (58.5 kilometres) between Pretoria and Germiston were covered at an average speed of 37.3 miles per hour (60 kilometres per hour) in both directions.

Most of their working lives were, however, spent on the Cape Midland system, where they were used on the mainline out of Port Elizabeth. Two of them worked as station pilots at Kimberley until 1960, when they joined the rest of the Class which were by then working the suburban between Port Elizabeth and Uitenhage.

In later years, they also served on the Reef's suburban routes, while a few were used in the same service around Cape Town until they were eventually relegated to shunting work. They were scrapped in 1974.

== Preservation ==
Of the Class 10BR, three survived into preservation.

| Number | Owner | Current location |
|---|---|---|
| 750 | Transnet Heritage Foundation | Roodepoort Station |
| 756 | Transnet Heritage Foundation | Kroonstad Station |
| 758 | Uitenhage Railway Museum | Uitenhage Railway Museum |
