= South African Class 9 4-6-2 =

1904 design of steam locomotive

CSAR Class 9 4-6-2 South African Class 9 4-6-2
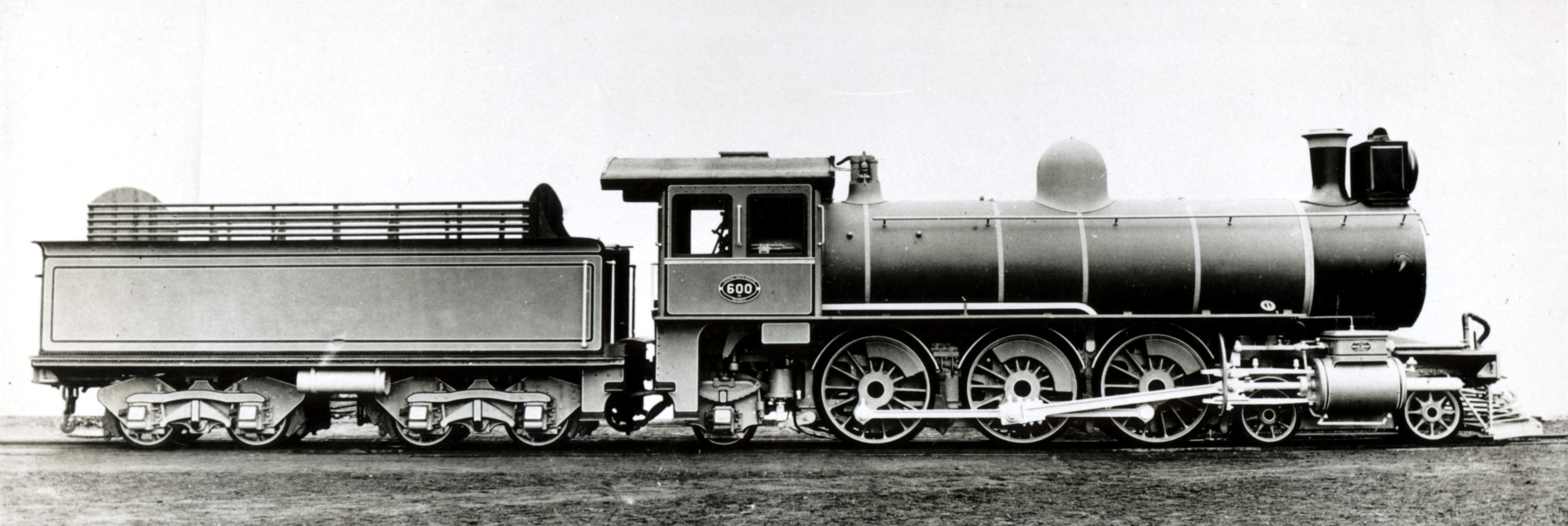
- CSAR no. 600, SAR no. 727, c. 1904
Type and origin
- Power type: Steam
- Designer: Central South African Railways (P.A. Hyde)
- Builder: Vulcan Foundry
- Serial number: 1904-1907, 1985
- Model: CSAR Class 9
- Build date: 1904
- Total produced: 5
Specifications
- Configuration
  - Whyte: 4-6-2 (Pacific)
  - UIC: 2'C1'n2
- Driver: 2nd coupled axle
- Gauge: 3 ft 6 in (1,067 mm) Cape gauge
- Leading dia.: 30 in (762 mm)
- Coupled dia.: 57 in (1,448 mm)
- Trailing dia.: 30 in (762 mm)
- Tender wheels: 33 1/2 in (851 mm) as built 34 in (864 mm) retyred
- Wheelbase: 52 ft 5/8 in (15,865 mm)
  - Axle spacing (Asymmetrical): 1-2: 5 ft 3 in (1,600 mm); 2-3: 5 ft 9 in (1,753 mm)
  - Engine: 27 ft 8 1/2 in (8,446 mm)
  - Leading: 6 ft 4 in (1,930 mm)
  - Coupled: 11 ft (3,353 mm)
  - Tender: 17 ft 3/8 in (5,191 mm)
  - Tender bogie: 4 ft 7 in (1,397 mm)
- Length
  - Over couplers: 59 ft 10 3/4 in (18,256 mm)
- Height: 12 ft 10 in (3,912 mm)
- Frame type: Bar
- Axle load: 13 LT 1 cwt (13,260 kg)
  - Leading: 13 LT 16 cwt 2 qtr (14,050 kg)
  - 1st coupled: 13 LT 0 cwt 2 qtr (13,230 kg)
  - 2nd coupled: 13 LT 1 cwt (13,260 kg)
  - 3rd coupled: 12 LT 19 cwt (13,160 kg)
  - Trailing: 7 LT 10 cwt 3 qtr (7,658 kg)
  - Tender bogie: 23 LT 15 cwt (24,130 kg) each
  - Tender axle: 11 LT 17 cwt 2 qtr (12,070 kg)
- Adhesive weight: 39 LT 0 cwt 2 qtr (39,650 kg)
- Loco weight: 60 LT 7 cwt 3 qtr (61,360 kg)
- Tender weight: 47 LT 10 cwt (48,260 kg)
- Total weight: 107 LT 17 cwt 3 qtr (109,600 kg)
- Tender type: XM3 (2-axle bogies)
- Fuel type: Coal
- Fuel capacity: 10 LT (10.2 t)
- Water cap.: 4,000 imp gal (18,200 L)
- Firebox
  - Type: Round-top
  - Grate area: 21.75 sq ft (2.021 m^{2})
- Boiler
  - Pitch: 7 ft 3 in (2,210 mm)
  - Diameter: 5 ft (1,524 mm)
  - Tube plates: 12 ft 7 in (3,835 mm)
  - Small tubes: 205: 2 in (51 mm)
- Boiler pressure: 200 psi (1,379 kPa)
- Safety valve: Ramsbottom
- Heating surface
  - Firebox: 131 sq ft (12.2 m^{2})
  - Tubes: 1,350 sq ft (125 m^{2})
  - Total surface: 1,481 sq ft (137.6 m^{2})
- Cylinders: Two
- Cylinder size: 18 in (457 mm) bore 26 in (660 mm) stroke
- Valve gear: Stephenson
- Valve type: Balanced slide
- Couplers: Johnston link-and-pin
Performance figures
- Tractive effort: 22,170 lbf (98.6 kN) @ 75%
Career
- Operators: Central South African Railways; South African Railways
- Class: CSAR & SAR Class 9
- Number in class: 5
- Numbers: CSAR 600-604, SAR 727-731
- Delivered: 1904
- First run: 1904
- Withdrawn: 1926
- The 2nd coupled axle had flangeless wheels

The South African Railways Class 9 4-6-2 of 1904 was a steam locomotive from the pre-Union era in Transvaal Colony.

In 1904, the Central South African Railways placed five Class 9 steam locomotives with a 4-6-2 Pacific type wheel arrangement in service. In 1912, when they were assimilated into the South African Railways, they were renumbered but retained their Class 9 designation.

== Central South African Railways ==
=== Establishment ===
Upon its establishment in 1902 at the end of the Second Boer War, the Central South African Railways (CSAR) inherited a variety of locomotive types from the Imperial Military Railways (IMR), which had been established by the British military during the war through the absorption of the separate state and other railways of the Zuid-Afrikaansche Republiek (ZAR) and the Oranje-Vrijstaat as possession was obtained of the territories of these two republics.

The larger two of these constituent railways were the Nederlandsche-Zuid-Afrikaansche Spoorweg-Maatschappij (NZASM), which operated between Pretoria, capital of the ZAR, and Lourenço Marques, capital of the Portuguese colony of Moçambique, and the Oranje-Vrijstaat Gouwerment-Spoorwegen (OVGS). Smaller constituents were the Pretoria-Pietersburg Railway (PPR) and the Selati Railway.

Of the mixed amalgam of locomotives which were inherited from these railways, the best was probably the 8th Class 4-8-0, designed by H.M. Beatty of the Cape Government Railways (CGR). These locomotives were brand new, having been acquired by the IMR shortly before the end of the war, and featured a bar frame, narrow firebox and cylinders with overhead slide valves actuated by Stephenson valve gear.

While the Orange Free State obtained their locomotives second-hand from the CGR or directly from the manufacturers used by the CGR, the mainly German suppliers of railway equipment to the old NZASM underestimated the requirements of a railway that would extend over 291 miles (468 kilometres) from Komatipoort at the border with Mozambique to Pretoria and rise 6,000 ft (1,829 m) in the process. Apart from the various smaller tank locomotives, they supplied the NZASM with 46 Tonner 0-6-4 tank engines with an adhesive weight of 32 tons and a tractive effort of 16,580 pounds-force (73.8 kilonewtons) to work a mainline.

=== Transformation ===
Within two years, the CSAR would be transformed by P.A. Hyde, its first Chief Locomotive Superintendent, who introduced these 4-6-2 Pacifics with an adhesive weight of 39 tons and a tractive effort of 22,170 pounds-force (98.6 kilonewtons), the Class 10 4-6-2 Pacifics with an adhesive weight of 46 tons and a tractive effort of 24,470 pounds-force (108.8 kilonewtons) and the Class 11 2-8-2 Mikados with an adhesive weight of 62 tons and a tractive effort of 30,780 pounds-force (136.9 kilonewtons). These designs by Hyde were cutting edge technology at the time.

For the express passenger service between Johannesburg and Pretoria and long-distance passenger services to Cape Town, the CSAR also introduced passenger coaches with closed vestibules, concertina connections and Gould knuckle couplers. This automatic coupling system would only begin to be implemented on the South African Railways (SAR) in 1927. At the time, all this modern equipment placed the CSAR ahead of both the CGR and Natal Government Railways (NGR) in terms of technical advancement.

== Design ==
The first locomotives to be designed by Hyde for the CSAR were based on Beatty’s 8th Class 4-8-0 locomotive. Hyde designed this 4-6-2 Pacific version which became the CSAR's Class 9 and, at the same time, he extrapolated this design to a 4-6-4 tank locomotive for heavy suburban trains which later became the SAR Class F. Both locomotives were ordered in 1904.

Five Pacific locomotives were ordered from the Vulcan Foundry of Newton-le-Willows in England and delivered in 1904. They were numbered in the range from 600 to 604 and designated Class 9 by the CSAR.

== Characteristics ==
The locomotives had bar frames and used saturated steam. They had balanced slide valves, arranged above the cylinders and actuated by Stephenson valve gear through rocker shafts. The firebox was fitted with Stroudley's flexible stays and the back casing plate was flanged outwards to facilitate the removal of the internal firebox for renewals.

As built, the smokebox was equipped with openings on its sides, near the front, with covers which each had a handle by which it could be opened with a half turn to give direct access to the inside of the smokebox. These openings were known by a variety of terms, the most common being "cinder pocket" or "cleaning hole and cap". Its purpose was, most likely, to facilitate cleaning of the spark arrestor screens to overcome clogging without having to open the smokebox door. The cover handles were attached to the smokebox side by a small chain. Judging from photographs, these covers were removed and the openings closed off in the SAR era.

== Renumbering ==
When the Union of South Africa was established on 31 May 1910, the three Colonial government railways (CGR, NGR and CSAR) were united under a single administration to control and administer the railways, ports and harbours of the Union. Although the South African Railways and Harbours came into existence in 1910, the actual classification and renumbering of all the rolling stock of the three constituent railways were only implemented with effect from 1 January 1912.

In 1912, these locomotives were renumbered in the range from 727 to 731 on the SAR, but retained their Class 9 classification. Their tenders, which were unique to the Class, were designated Type XM3.

== Service ==
The Class 9 was very useful for passenger work with moderate loads and worked the Durban-bound mail trains from Johannesburg as far as Charlestown on the Transvaal-Natal border for many years. Later they served mainly on mainline passenger working elsewhere in Transvaal, ending their days working out of Pretoria on the Pietersburg line in the 1920s. They were withdrawn by 1926.

== Illustration ==
The main picture is a builder's picture of the Class 9. In the picture below, the cinder pocket cover can be seen above the head of the person at far left.

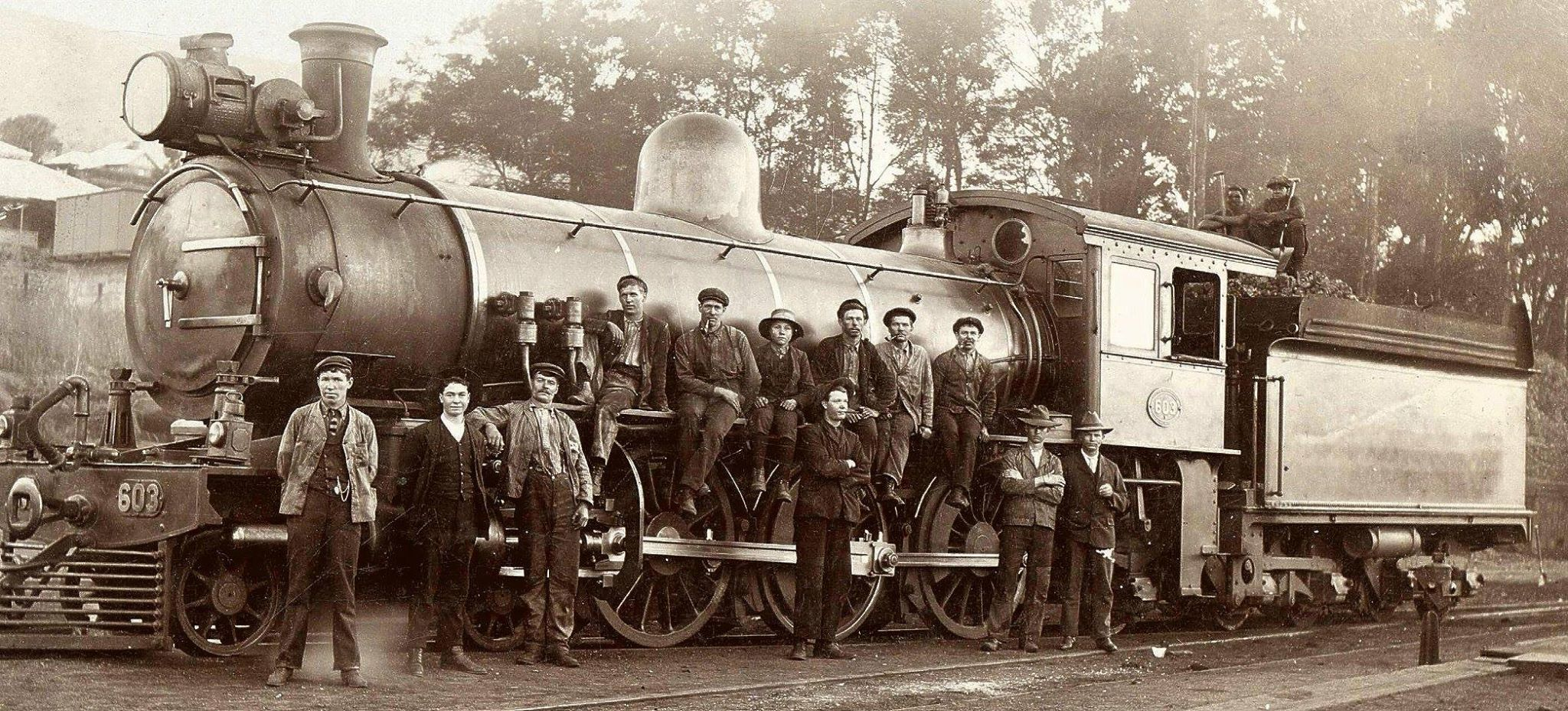
CSAR Class 9 no. 603 and railwaymen, c. 1910
