= South African Class 10 4-6-2 =

1904 design of steam locomotive

CSAR Class 10 4-6-2 1904 South African Class 10 4-6-2
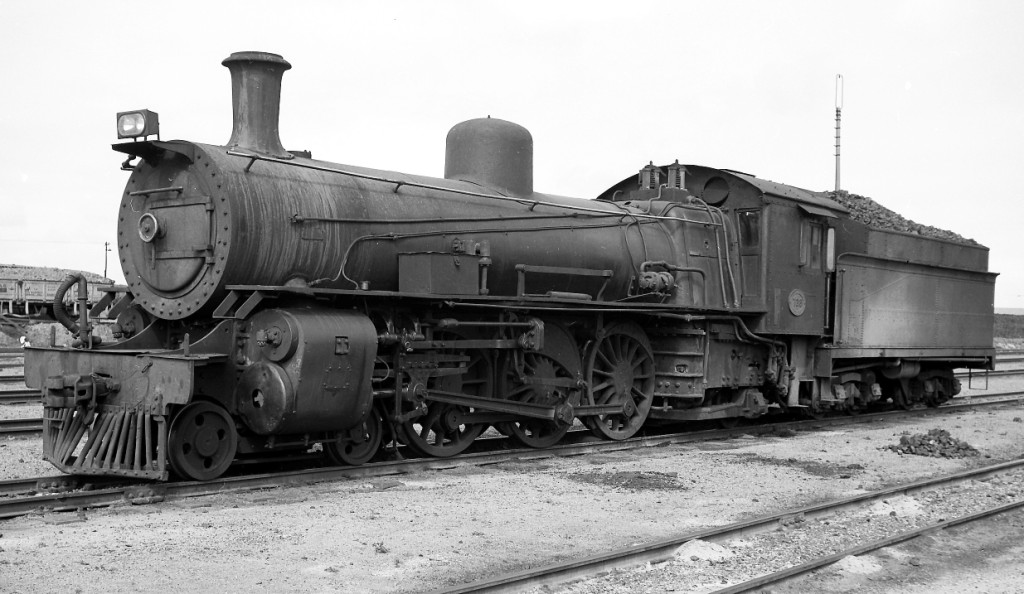
- SAR no. 738 (ex CSAR no. 656) at Sydenham Loco depot, 4 September 1966
Type and origin
- ♠ Type XM2 tender – ♥ Type XP1 tender (No. 746)
- Power type: Steam
- Designer: Central South African Railways (P.A. Hyde)
- Builder: North British Locomotive Company
- Serial number: 16194-16203, 16226-16230
- Model: CSAR Class 10
- Build date: 1904
- Total produced: 15
Specifications
- Configuration
  - Whyte: 4-6-2 (Pacific)
  - UIC: 2'C1'h2
- Driver: 2nd coupled axle
- Gauge: 3 ft 6 in (1,067 mm) Cape gauge
- Leading dia.: 28 1/2 in (724 mm)
- Coupled dia.: 62 in (1,575 mm) as built 63 in (1,600 mm) no. 745
- Trailing dia.: 33 in (838 mm)
- Tender wheels: ♠ 33 1/2 in (851 mm) as built 34 in (864 mm) retyred ♥ 34 in (864 mm)
- Wheelbase: 56 ft 4 in (17,170 mm)
  - Engine: 30 ft 2 in (9,195 mm)
  - Leading: 6 ft (1,829 mm)
  - Coupled: 10 ft 10 in (3,302 mm)
  - Tender: ♠♥ 16 ft 9 in (5,105 mm)
  - Tender bogie: ♠♥ 4 ft 7 in (1,397 mm)
- Length
  - Over couplers: 64 ft 6 3/4 in (19,679 mm)
- Height: 12 ft 10 in (3,912 mm)
- Frame type: Plate
- Axle load: 15 LT 10 cwt (15,750 kg)
  - Leading: 13 LT 10 cwt (13,720 kg)
  - 1st coupled: 15 LT (15,240 kg)
  - 2nd coupled: 15 LT 10 cwt (15,750 kg)
  - 3rd coupled: 15 LT 10 cwt (15,750 kg)
  - Trailing: 13 LT 5 cwt (13,460 kg)
  - Tender bogie: Bogie 1: ♠ 24 LT 4 cwt (24,590 kg) ♥ 27 LT 10 cwt (27,940 kg); Bogie 2: ♠ 25 LT 3 cwt (25,550 kg) ♥ 23 LT 11 cwt (23,930 kg)
  - Tender axle: ♠ 12 LT 11 cwt 2 qtr (12,780 kg) ♥ 13 LT 15 cwt (13,970 kg)
- Adhesive weight: 46 LT (46,740 kg)
- Loco weight: 72 LT 15 cwt (73,920 kg)
- Tender weight: ♠ 49 LT 7 cwt (50,140 kg) ♥ 51 LT 1 cwt (51,870 kg)
- Total weight: ♠ 122 LT 2 cwt (124,100 kg) ♥ 123 LT 16 cwt (125,800 kg)
- Tender type: ♠ XM2 (2-axle bogies) ♥ XP1 (2-axle bogies); XC, XC1, XD, XE, XE1, XF, XF1, XF2, XJ, XM, XM1, XM2, XM3, XM4, XP1, XS permitted
- Fuel type: Coal
- Fuel capacity: ♠♥ 10 LT (10.2 t)
- Water cap.: ♠ 4,000 imp gal (18,200 L) ♥ 4,250 imp gal (19,300 L)
- Firebox
  - Type: Belpaire
  - Grate area: 35 sq ft (3.3 m^{2})
- Boiler
  - Pitch: 7 ft 4 in (2,235 mm)
  - Diameter: 4 ft 6 3/4 in (1,391 mm)
  - Tube plates: 18 ft 6 1/2 in (5,652 mm)
  - Small tubes: 92: 2 1/4 in (57 mm)
  - Large tubes: 18: 5 1/4 in (133 mm)
- Boiler pressure: 190 psi (1,310 kPa)
- Safety valve: Ramsbottom
- Heating surface
  - Firebox: 125 sq ft (11.6 m^{2})
  - Tubes: 1,463 sq ft (135.9 m^{2})
  - Total surface: 1,588 sq ft (147.5 m^{2})
- Superheater
  - Heating area: 384 sq ft (35.7 m^{2})
- Cylinders: Two
- Cylinder size: 19 1/2 in (495 mm) bore 28 in (711 mm) stroke
- Valve gear: Walschaerts
- Valve type: Piston
- Couplers: Johnston link-and-pin AAR knuckle (1930s)
Performance figures
- Tractive effort: 24,470 lbf (108.8 kN) @ 75%
Career
- Operators: Central South African Railways; South African Railways
- Class: CSAR & SAR Class 10
- Number in class: 15
- Numbers: CSAR 650-664, SAR 732-746
- Delivered: 1904
- First run: 1904
- Withdrawn: 1972
- The 2nd coupled axle had flangeless wheels

The South African Railways Class 10 4-6-2 of 1904 was a steam locomotive from the pre-Union era in Transvaal Colony.

In July 1904, the Central South African Railways placed fifteen Class 10 steam locomotives with a 4-6-2 Pacific type wheel arrangement in service. In 1912, when they were assimilated into the South African Railways, they were renumbered but retained their Class 10 designation.

== Manufacturer ==
Fifteen 4-6-2 Pacific type passenger locomotives, designed by Central South African Railways (CSAR) Chief Locomotive Superintendent P.A. Hyde, were ordered from the North British Locomotive Company (NBL) and delivered in 1904, numbered in the range from 650 to 664. They were designated Class 10 by the CSAR.

== Characteristics ==
The Class 10 was designed by Hyde to take full advantage of the new 80 pounds per yard (40 kilograms per metre) track of the CSAR, which was gradually replacing the old 60 pounds per yard (30 kilograms per metre) sections on mainlines. The locomotive had plate frames, a wide Belpaire firebox, outside admission piston valves and Walschaerts valve gear, and was superheated. Its 62 inches (1,575 millimetres) coupled wheels were 2 inches (51 millimetres) larger in diameter than those of H.M. Beatty's Karoo Class Pacific which had entered service on the Cape Government Railways (CGR) the year before. At the time, the CSAR Classes 10 and 11 which were acquired simultaneously, were the heaviest and largest locomotives built for 3 feet 6 inches (1,067 millimetres) gauge.

These locomotives were to form the basis for further development of the Pacific type, which was to become the standard express passenger steam locomotive type in South Africa. They were handsome locomotives and their appearance was enhanced by the use of planished steel plates to cover the boiler and cylinder lagging. They were equipped with two whistles of different tones and a steam turbine generator, mounted on the smokebox between the headlight and the chimney, to power the Edwards headlight.

=== Firebox ===
The Class 10 was of an extremely advanced design for the day. At 7 feet 3 inches (2,210 millimetres) long, the firebox was somewhat shorter than usual practice, but much wider at 6 feet 1 1/2 inches (1,867 millimetres). It had a rocking firegrate with a drop grate at the front. The rocking grate was operated by a small steam cylinder of 4 inches (102 millimetres) bore and 6 inches (152 millimetres) stroke, arranged under the footplate. This arrangement became standard practice on all new locomotives, except on those equipped with mechanical stokers where it was found preferable to divide the grate into sections which could be shaken separately by hand gear.

=== Boiler ===
The locomotive's most striking feature was the length of the boiler and smokebox. The boiler barrel was of telescopic design and was built up of three 6 feet 5 5/16 inches (1,964 millimetres) sections, with a lap of 4 1/2 inches (114 millimetres) and made of 5/8 inch (16 millimetres) thick plates. At 7 feet 4 inches (2,235 millimetres) above rail level, its boiler centre line or pitch was higher than that of any other locomotive in service in South Africa at the time.

The boiler was fitted with Hornish type mechanical cleaners. Two were attached to the top of the foundation ring at the front and back, and a third to the front plate of the barrel, approximately at water level. The latter was intended for the removal of scum and was operated by a rod, attached to the cleaner cock and passed along the left side of the engine cab. When the scum cock was in operation, steam and water coming through the cock were carried to the front of the engine through a pipe. Both cleaners on the foundation ring were provided with separate hand-operated cocks. These fittings were not perpetuated on any subsequent locomotive designs.

== South African Railways ==
When the Union of South Africa was established on 31 May 1910, the three Colonial government railways (CGR, Natal Government Railways and CSAR) were united under a single administration to control and administer the railways, ports and harbours of the Union. Although the South African Railways and Harbours came into existence in 1910, the actual classification and renumbering of all the rolling stock of the three constituent railways were only implemented with effect from 1 January 1912.

When these locomotives were assimilated into the South African Railways (SAR) in 1912, they retained the Class 10 classification, but were renumbered in the range from 732 to 746.

== Modifications ==
Two of the locomotives were later modified by the SAR. No. 745 was equipped with 1 inch (25 millimetres) larger diameter tyres on its coupled wheels, while no. 746 was coupled to a modified Type MP1 tender. The intermediate draw and buffing gear of the tender, no. 1634 off a Class MC1 Mallet locomotive, was altered to suit no. 746. This modification converted tender no. 1634 to the sole Type XP1 tender. While it had the same coal capacity as the Type XM2 with which the locomotives were delivered, it had a 250 imperial gallons (1,140 litres) larger water capacity.

The rest of the fleet remained unmodified and, unlike their Classes 10A, 10B and 10C successors, were never reboilered with Watson Standard boilers.

== Service ==
The Class 10 was placed in service to haul the fast passenger trains out of Johannesburg to Volksrust on the Natal line and to Klerksdorp on the new Cape line which was completed from Orkney to Fourteen Streams in 1906.

In later years, some were relocated to work in the Noupoort area, while the rest were relegated to suburban work on the lines from Germiston to Kliprivier and the Springs-Nigel-Heidelberg branch, or for pick-up work on the Braamfontein-Klerksdorp line.

Upon completion of the electrification projects from the Reef to Kroonstad and Witbank, the twelve surviving Class 10 locomotives at Germiston were transferred to Port Elizabeth on the Cape Midland during December 1959, for use on the Uitenhage suburban and other local services. They were eventually relegated to work as shunting engines until they were scrapped between 1971 and 1972, after 68 years in service.

No. 744 was eventually mounted outside the main station building at Springs, one of the first engines to be plinthed as part of the SAR Museum policy.

== Preservation ==
Of the Class S2, three survived into preservation. By 2018

Number	Works nmr	THF / Private	Leaselend / Owner	Current Location	Outside SOUTH AFRICA	?
735		THF	Reefsteamers	Germiston Locomotive DEPOT		
744		THF		Springs Station		

== Illustration ==
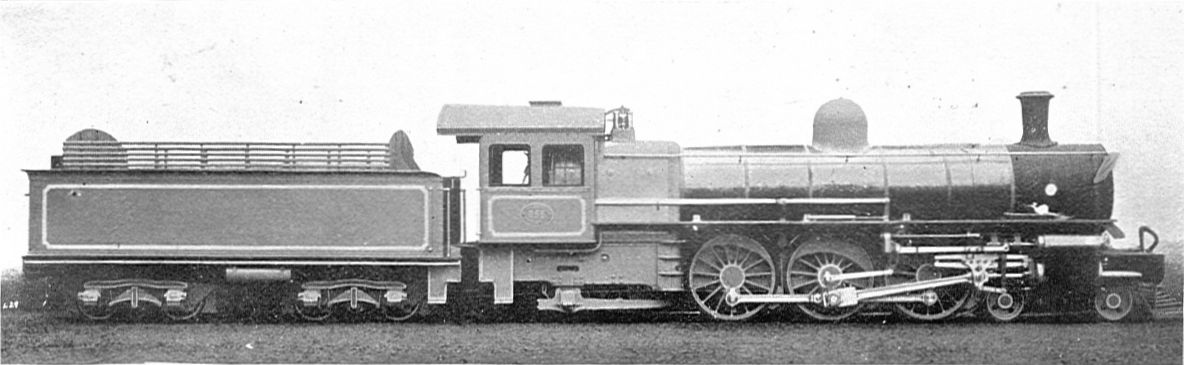
CSAR Class 10 no. 651, SAR no. 733, c. 1904

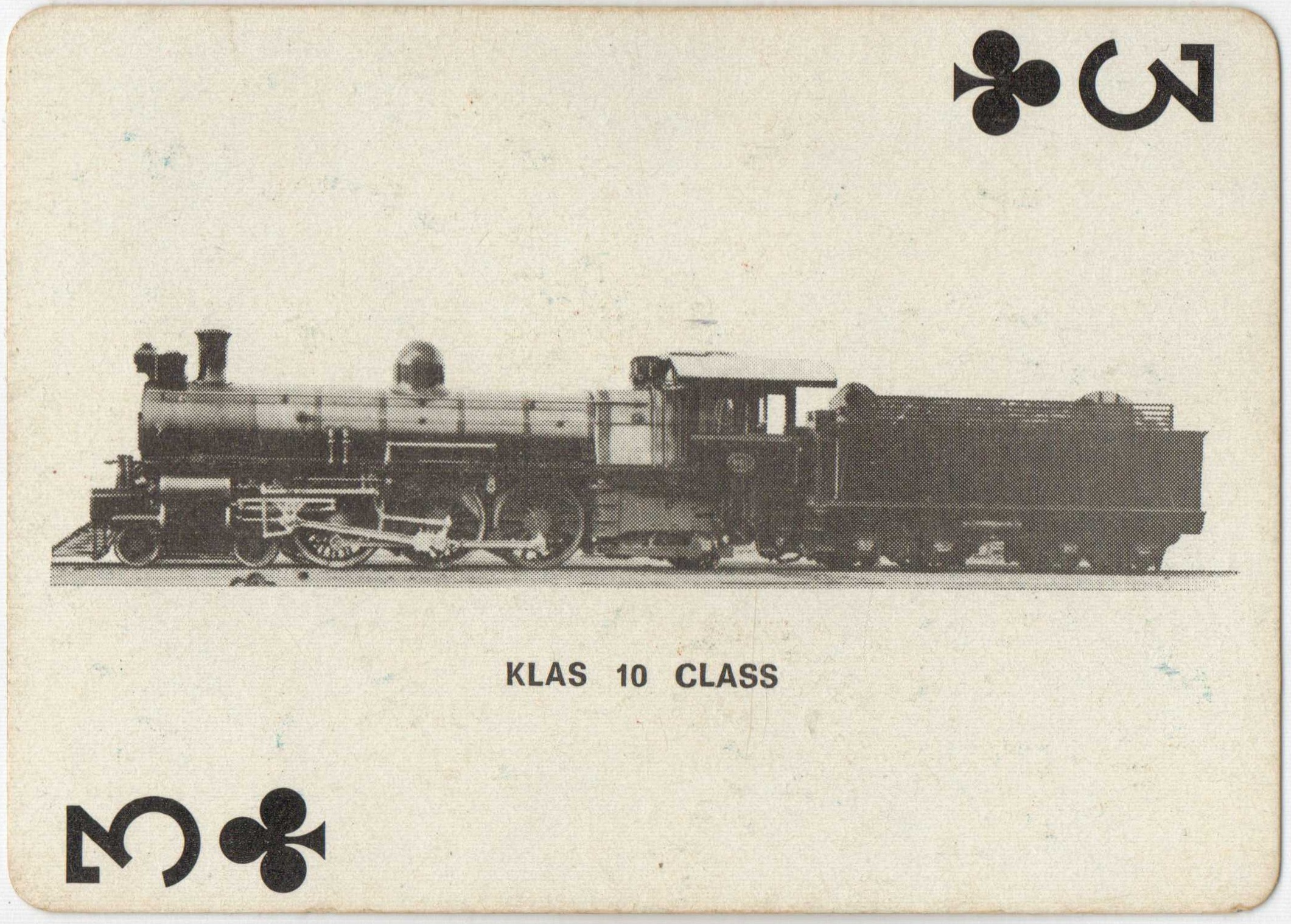
SAR no. 741

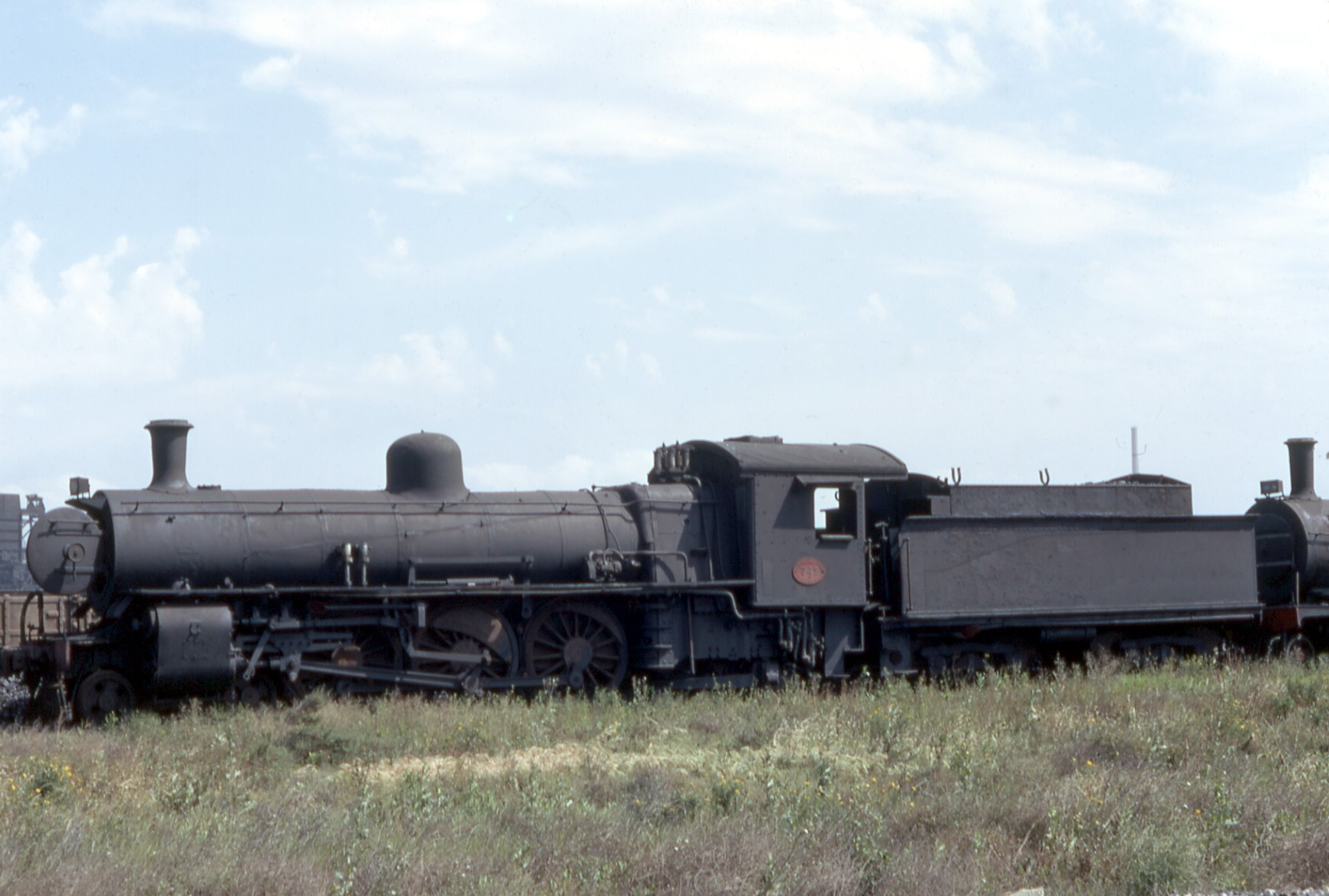
No. 745 staged for preservation, November 1971
