= South African Class 4 4-8-2 =

1911 design of steam locomotive

CGR Mountain 4-8-2 South African Class 4 4-8-2
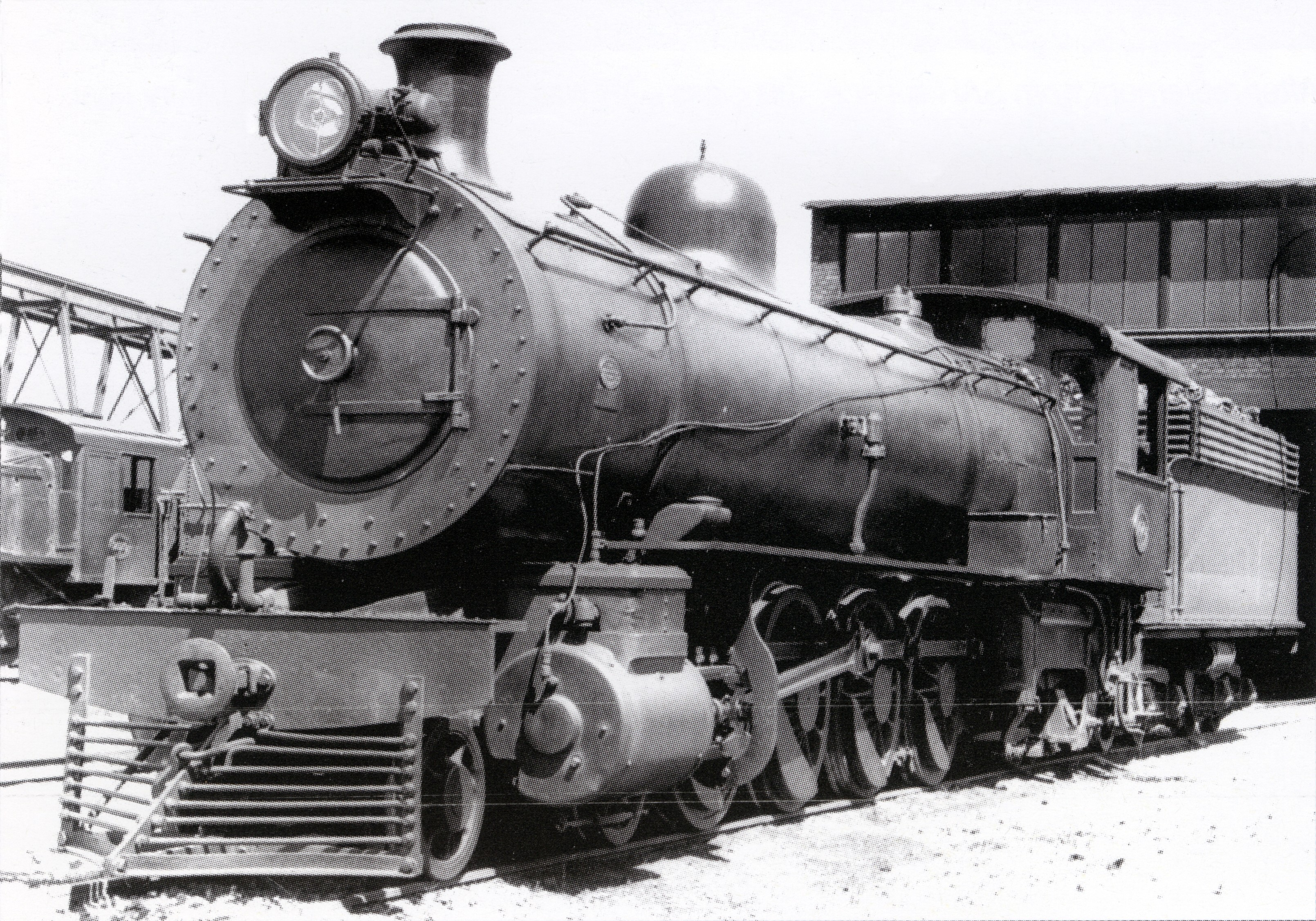
- SAR Class 4 no. 1478 at Worcester, c. 1930
Type and origin
- Power type: Steam
- Designer: Cape Government Railways (H.M. Beatty)
- Builder: North British Locomotive Company
- Serial number: 19242-19243
- Model: CGR 4-8-2
- Build date: 1911
- Total produced: 2
Specifications
- Configuration
  - Whyte: 4-8-2 (Mountain)
  - UIC: 2'D1'n2
- Driver: 2nd coupled axle
- Gauge: 3 ft 6 in (1,067 mm) Cape gauge
- Leading dia.: 28 1/2 in (724 mm)
- Coupled dia.: 54 in (1,372 mm)
- Trailing dia.: 33 in (838 mm)
- Tender wheels: 33 1/2 in (851 mm) as built 34 in (864 mm) retyred
- Wheelbase: 57 ft 8 3/8 in (17,586 mm)
  - Axle spacing (Asymmetrical): 1-2: 4 ft 10 in (1,473 mm); 2-3: 4 ft 9 in (1,448 mm); 3-4: 4 ft 10 in (1,473 mm)
  - Engine: 31 ft 11 in (9,728 mm)
  - Leading: 6 ft 2 in (1,880 mm)
  - Coupled: 14 ft 5 in (4,394 mm)
  - Tender: 16 ft 1 in (4,902 mm)
  - Tender bogie: 4 ft 7 in (1,397 mm)
- Length
  - Over couplers: 65 ft 3/8 in (19,822 mm)
- Height: 12 ft 10 in (3,912 mm)
- Frame type: Bar
- Axle load: 15 LT (15,240 kg)
  - Leading: 11 LT 3 cwt (11,330 kg)
  - 1st coupled: 14 LT 10 cwt (14,730 kg)
  - 2nd coupled: 14 LT 15 cwt (14,990 kg)
  - 3rd coupled: 14 LT 17 cwt (15,090 kg)
  - 4th coupled: 15 LT (15,240 kg)
  - Tender bogie: Bogie 1: 21 LT 11 cwt (21,900 kg); Bogie 2: 21 LT 18 cwt (22,250 kg)
  - Tender axle: 10 LT 19 cwt (11,130 kg)
- Adhesive weight: 59 LT 2 cwt (60,050 kg)
- Loco weight: 82 LT 2 cwt (83,420 kg)
- Tender weight: 43 LT 9 cwt (44,150 kg)
- Total weight: 125 LT 11 cwt (127,600 kg)
- Tender type: XJ (2-axle bogies)
- Fuel type: Coal
- Fuel capacity: 6 LT 10 cwt (6.6 t)
- Water cap.: 3,500 imp gal (15,900 L)
- Firebox
  - Type: Round-top, combustion chamber
  - Grate area: 37 sq ft (3.4 m^{2})
- Boiler
  - Pitch: 7 ft 6 in (2,286 mm)
  - Diameter: 5 ft 6 3/8 in (1,686 mm)
  - Tube plates: 18 ft (5,486 mm)
  - Small tubes: 201: 2 1/4 in (57 mm)
- Boiler pressure: 180 psi (1,241 kPa)
- Safety valve: Ramsbottom (No. 850/1477); Cole's Pop (No. 851/1478)
- Heating surface
  - Firebox: 186 sq ft (17.3 m^{2})
  - Tubes: 2,131 sq ft (198.0 m^{2})
  - Total surface: 2,317 sq ft (215.3 m^{2})
- Cylinders: Two
- Cylinder size: 20 1/2 in (521 mm) bore 28 in (711 mm) stroke
- Valve gear: Stephenson
- Valve type: Murdoch's D slide
- Couplers: Johnston link-and-pin
Performance figures
- Tractive effort: 29,420 lbf (130.9 kN) @ 75%
Career
- Operators: Cape Government Railways; South African Railways
- Class: SAR Class 4
- Number in class: 2
- Numbers: CGR 850-851; SAR 1477-1478
- Delivered: 1911
- First run: 1911
- Withdrawn: 1938
- The leading coupled axle had flangeless wheels

The South African Railways Class 4 4-8-2 of 1911 was a steam locomotive from the pre-Union era in the Cape of Good Hope.

In 1911, the Cape Government Railways placed two steam locomotives with a 4-8-2 Mountain type wheel arrangement in service. They were renumbered and designated Class 4 when they were assimilated into the South African Railways a year later.

== Manufacturer ==
The first 4-8-2 Mountain type locomotive of the Cape Government Railways (CGR) was designed as a heavy mixed traffic engine at the Salt River shops by H.M. Beatty, the Chief Locomotive Superintendent of the CGR from 1896 to 1910. Two locomotives were built by the North British Locomotive Company (NBL) and delivered in March 1911.

== Characteristics ==
The locomotives were a further development of the two experimental locomotives which had been placed in service by the CGR in 1906, the CGR Class 9 2-8-2 (SAR Class Experimental 5) and the CGR Class 10 4-8-0 (SAR Class Experimental 6), both built by Kitson and Company.

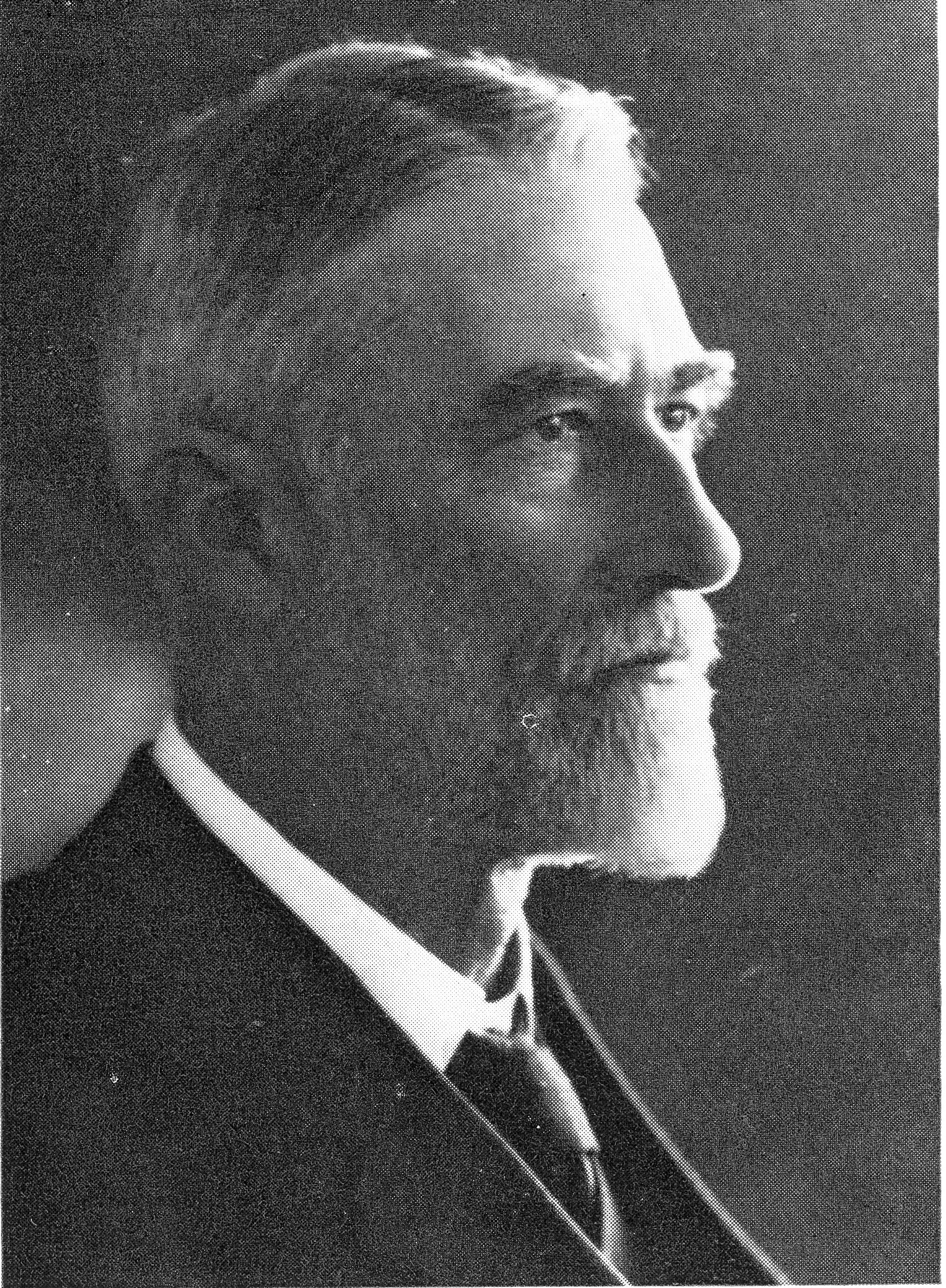
H.M. Beatty

The Class 4 locomotives had 4 1/2 inches (114 millimetres) thick bar frames, Stephenson valve gear with flat "D" slide valves arranged above the cylinders, and used saturated steam. The boiler was equipped with a combustion chamber which was carried forward 2 feet (610 millimetres) from the firebox into the boiler barrel, of which the diameter was increased at the hind course to suit. This reduced the distance between the tube plates to 18 feet (5,486 millimetres) and made them excellent steamers.

They were numbered 850 and 851 in the CGR numbering sequence, but were not designated a classification. The two engines were not identical, no. 850 being equipped with the usual Ramsbottom safety valves while no. 851 had Cole's muffled type Pop safety valves, both set to open at 180 pounds per square inch (1,241 kilopascals) boiler pressure. They were delivered with Type XJ tenders with a 6 long tons 10 hundredweight (6.6 tonnes) coal and a 3,500 imperial gallons (15,900 litres) water capacity.

== South African Railways ==
Railway network of the Cape Government Railways in 1910, upon the establishment of the Union of South Africa and the South African Railways

When the Union of South Africa was established on 31 May 1910, the three Colonial government railways (CGR, Natal Government Railways and Central South African Railways) were united under a single administration to control and administer the railways, ports and harbours of the Union. Although the South African Railways and Harbours came into existence in 1910, with Sir William Hoy appointed as its first General Manager, the actual classification and renumbering of all the rolling stock of the three constituent railways were only implemented with effect from 1 January 1912.

In 1912, these two locomotives were renumbered to 1477 and 1478 and designated Class 4 on the SAR.

== Service ==
Both locomotives were placed in service in the Karoo, working between Touws River and Beaufort West. In their later years they were stationed at Worcester, from where they were used extensively on and around the Cape Western system's mainline, working pick-up goods trains to De Doorns in the Hex River valley and on the Mosselbaai line via Robertson.

They were withdrawn from service by 1938.

== Illustration ==
The main picture shows SAR no. 1478 at Worcester, c. 1930, with Cole's Pop safety valves.

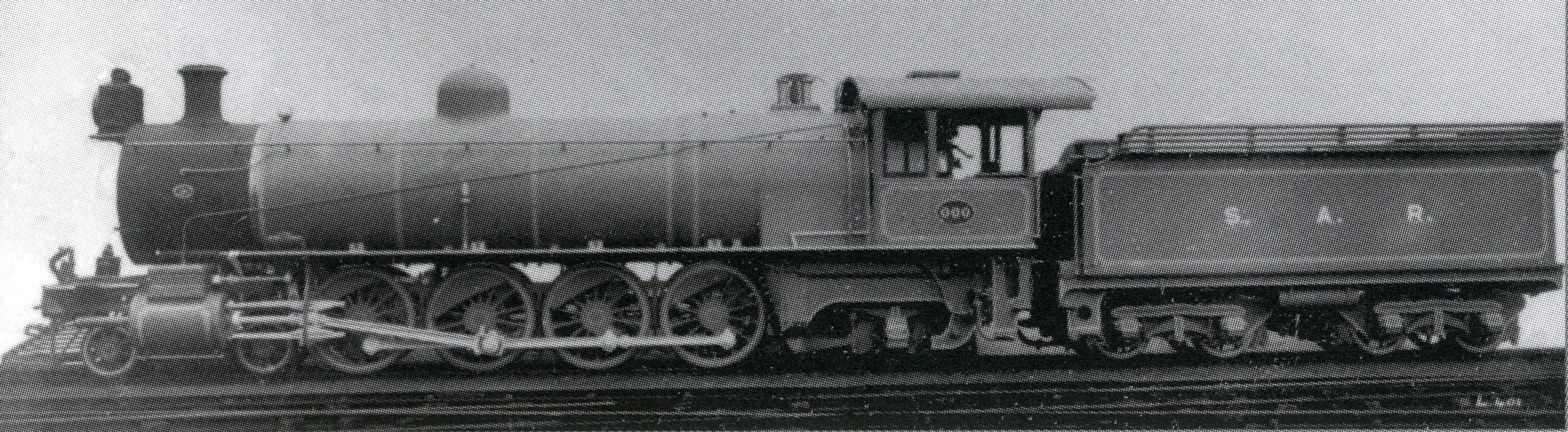
GCR no. 850, SAR no. 1477, with Ramsbottom safety valves
