= Cape Government Railways 6th Class locomotives =

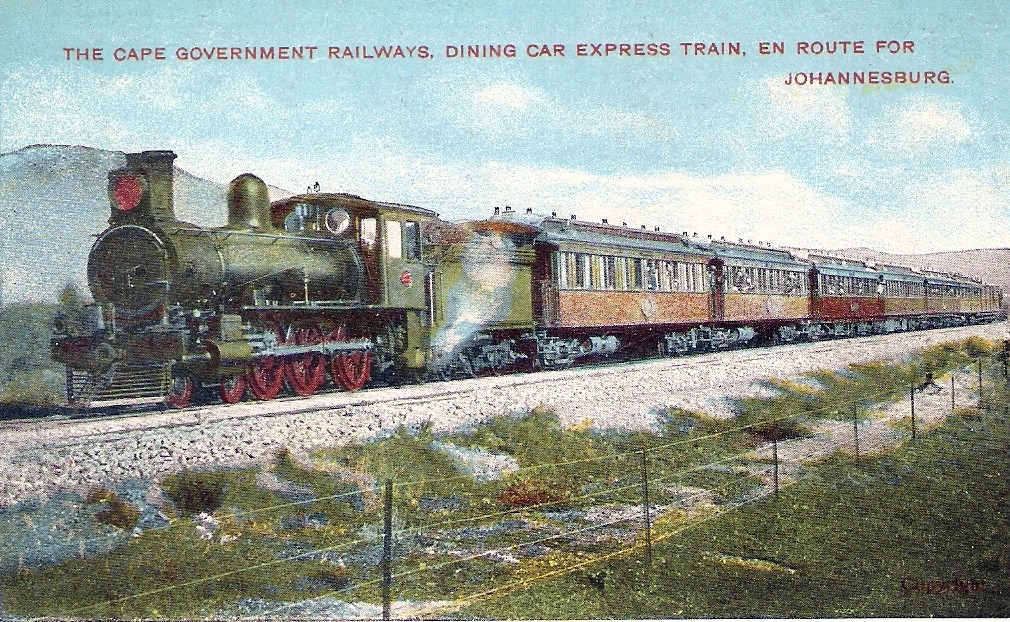
CGR 6th Class 4-6-0 1902

The Cape Government Railways 6th Class locomotives include twelve locomotive models, all designated 6th Class irrespective of differences in wheel arrangement or characteristics.

When the Union of South Africa was established on 31 May 1910, the three Colonial government railways (Cape Government Railways, Natal Government Railways and Central South African Railways) were united under a single administration to control and administer the railways, ports and harbours of the Union. The Cape Government Railways 6th Class locomotives were grouped into twelve different sub-classes on the new South African Railways.

2-6-2 wheel arrangement

- CGR 6th Class 2-6-2 (SAR Class 6Y)

2-6-4 wheel arrangement

- CGR 6th Class 2-6-4 (SAR Class 6Z)

4-6-0 wheel arrangement

- CGR 6th Class 4-6-0 1893 (SAR Class 6)
- CGR 6th Class 4-6-0 1896 (SAR Class 6A)
- CGR 6th Class 4-6-0 1897 (SAR Class 6B)
- CGR 6th Class 4-6-0 1898 (SAR Class 6D)
- CGR 6th Class 4-6-0 1900 (SAR Class 6F)
- CGR 6th Class 4-6-0 1901 Baldwin (SAR Class 6K)
- CGR 6th Class 4-6-0 1901 Neilson, Reid (SAR Class 6H)
- CGR 6th Class 4-6-0 1901 Schenectady (SAR Class 6G)
- CGR 6th Class 4-6-0 1902 (SAR Class 6J)
- CGR 6th Class 4-6-0 1904 Experimental (SAR Class 6L)
