= South African Class Experimental 6 4-8-0 =

1906 design of steam locomotive

CGR 10th Class 4-8-0 South African Class Experimental 6 4-8-0
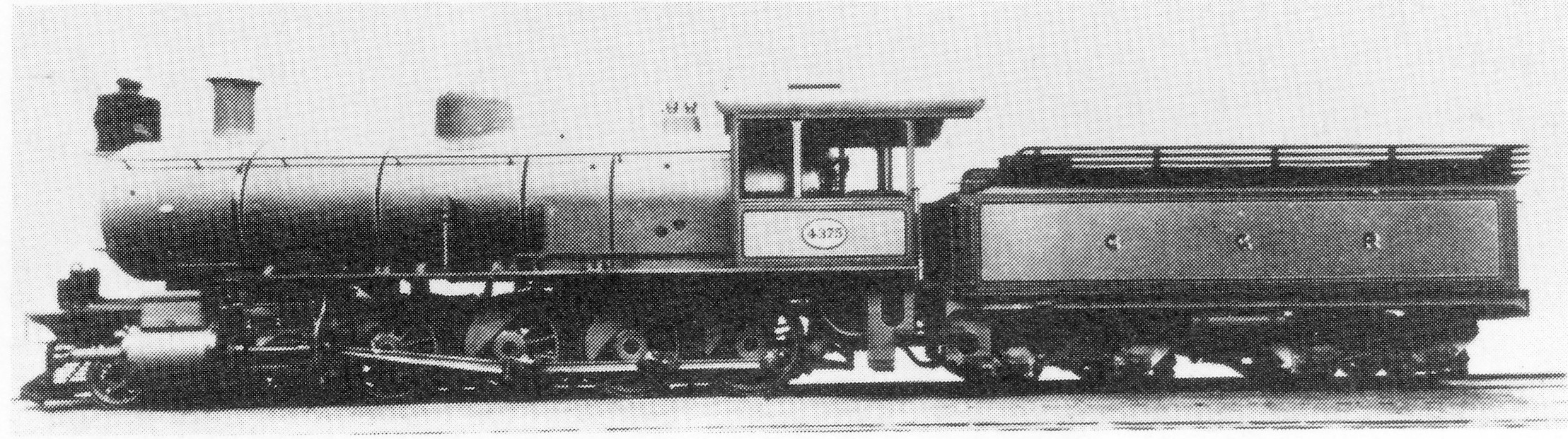
- CGR 10th Class no. 880, c. 1906
Type and origin
- Power type: Steam
- Designer: Cape Government Railways (H.M. Beatty)
- Builder: Kitson and Company
- Serial number: 4375
- Model: CGR 10th Class
- Build date: 1906
- Total produced: 1
Specifications
- Configuration
  - Whyte: 4-8-0 (Mastodon)
  - UIC: 2'Dn2
- Driver: 2nd coupled axle
- Gauge: 3 ft 6 in (1,067 mm) Cape gauge
- Leading dia.: 28 1/2 in (724 mm)
- Coupled dia.: 48 in (1,219 mm)
- Tender wheels: 33 1/2 in (851 mm) as built 34 in (864 mm) retyred
- Wheelbase: 49 ft 2 1/2 in (14,999 mm)
  - Engine: 23 ft 4 in (7,112 mm)
  - Leading: 6 ft (1,829 mm)
  - Coupled: 13 ft 6 in (4,115 mm)
  - Tender: 16 ft 1 in (4,902 mm)
  - Tender bogie: 4 ft 7 in (1,397 mm)
- Length
  - Over couplers: 56 ft 6 5/8 in (17,237 mm)
- Height: 12 ft 10 in (3,912 mm)
- Axle load: 13 LT 1 cwt (13,260 kg)
  - Leading: 13 LT 14 cwt (13,920 kg)
  - 1st coupled: 11 LT 19 cwt (12,140 kg)
  - 2nd coupled: 13 LT 1 cwt (13,260 kg)
  - 3rd coupled: 12 LT 4 cwt (12,400 kg)
  - 4th coupled: 12 LT 6 cwt (12,500 kg)
  - Tender bogie: Bogie 1: 20 LT 8 cwt (20,730 kg); Bogie 2: 21 LT 16 cwt (22,150 kg)
  - Tender axle: 10 LT 18 cwt (11,070 kg)
- Adhesive weight: 49 LT 10 cwt (50,290 kg)
- Loco weight: 63 LT 4 cwt (64,210 kg)
- Tender weight: 42 LT 4 cwt (42,880 kg)
- Total weight: 105 LT 8 cwt (107,100 kg)
- Tender type: XF2 (2-axle bogies)
- Fuel type: Coal
- Fuel capacity: 10 LT (10.2 t)
- Water cap.: 3,000 imp gal (13,600 L)
- Firebox
  - Type: Round-top & combustion chamber
  - Grate area: 31.2 sq ft (2.90 m^{2})
- Boiler
  - Pitch: 7 ft 5 in (2,261 mm)
  - Diameter: 5 ft (1,524 mm)
  - Tube plates: 11 ft 4 in (3,454 mm)
  - Small tubes: 215: 2 in (51 mm)
- Boiler pressure: 180 psi (1,241 kPa)
- Safety valve: Ramsbottom
- Heating surface
  - Firebox: 123.7 sq ft (11.49 m^{2})
  - Tubes: 1,274.6 sq ft (118.41 m^{2})
  - Total surface: 1,398.3 sq ft (129.91 m^{2})
- Cylinders: Two
- Cylinder size: 20 in (508 mm) bore 24 in (610 mm) stroke
- Valve gear: Stephenson
- Valve type: Murdoch's D slide
- Couplers: Johnston link-and-pin AAR knuckle (1930s)
Performance figures
- Tractive effort: 27,010 lbf (120.1 kN) @ 75%
Career
- Operators: Cape Government Railways; South African Railways
- Class: CGR 10th Class; SAR Class Experimental 6
- Number in class: 1
- Numbers: CGR 880, SAR 1244
- Delivered: 1906
- First run: 1906
- Withdrawn: 1938
- The leading coupled axle had flangeless wheels

The South African Railways Class Experimental 6 4-8-0 of 1906 was a steam locomotive from the pre-Union era in the Cape of Good Hope.

In 1906, the Cape Government Railways placed a single experimental 10th Class steam locomotive with a 4-8-0 Mastodon type wheel arrangement in service on its Eastern System. In 1912, when this locomotive was assimilated into the South African Railways, it was renumbered and designated Class Experimental 6.

== Manufacturer ==
The Cape 10th Class steam locomotive was designed by H.M. Beatty, the Locomotive Superintendent of the Cape Government Railways (CGR) from 1896 to 1910. The designs were prepared at the Salt River shops of the CGR in Cape Town and represented a further effort on Beatty's part to improve the steaming efficiency of his 8th Class of 1904. The 10th Class was, in most respects, a larger and more powerful version of the 8th Class, which it was meant to eventually replace on the Eastern System. In 1906, only one locomotive with a Type XF2 tender was delivered by Kitson and Company, numbered 880.

== Characteristics ==
With this locomotive, as with the 9th Class Mikado which had been delivered by the same manufacturer earlier in that same year, Beatty overcame his aversion to boiler centre lines which exceeded twice the Cape gauge track width of 3 feet 6 inches (1,067 millimetres) above the railhead. The boiler pitch of the Cape 10th Class was at 7 feet 5 inches (2,261 millimetres).

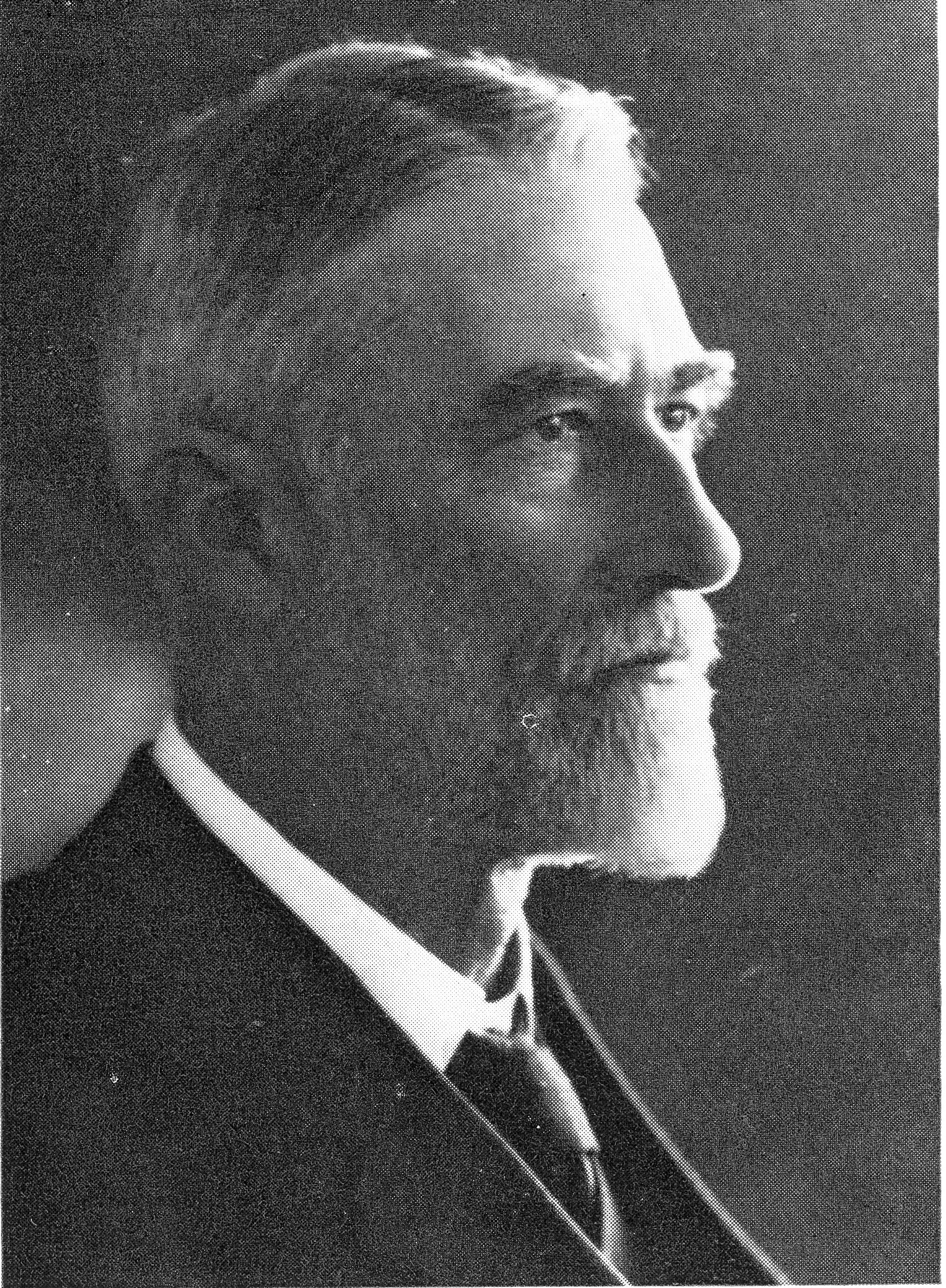
H.M. Beatty

In the designs of the two Cape 9th Class Mikado types, later the Classes Experimental 4 and Experimental 5, Beatty had achieved improved steaming efficiency by extending the locomotive frames with a bridle casting, such as the one he had designed for the CGR 6th Class 2-6-4 in 1901, to accommodate deep and wide fireboxes.

With the 10th Class, on the other hand, he obtained a wide firebox by spreading the grate over the rear coupled wheels, hence the requirement to raise the boiler pitch. The front portion of the firebox formed a combustion chamber, which reduced spark throwing and thereby reduced wear on the tube ends. The inside of the firebox was of copper and the plates were 5/8 inch (16 millimetres) thick throughout, except for the tube plate, which was 1 inch (25 millimetres) thick at the tube ends. This firebox design was uncomplicated and allowed for liberal water spaces. The result was a firebox which was virtually a copy of the one which was used on the Hendrie B locomotive which had been placed in service on the Natal Government Railways (NGR) in 1904.

The locomotive used saturated steam and had flat "D" type slide valves, placed above the cylinders and operated by Stephenson Link valve gear through rocker shafts. The leading wheels were mounted in a spring control bogie which was designed to overcome the problems of excessive flange wear on the coupled wheels and rail cutting on curves.

== Service ==
=== Cape Government Railways ===
The locomotive was placed in service on the Eastern System, working on the mainline out of East London. It proved to be very successful in service and was able to handle loads of 280 long tons (284 tonnes) up the steep 1 in 40 (2½%) gradient of the mainline, which began right at the end of the departure platform at East London station at the time. This compared favourably to the 240 long tons (244 tonnes) which the 8th Class could manage.

Despite its good performance, the design was never repeated since some trouble was experienced with the firebox which, although wide, had to be shallow to be carried over the intermediate and trailing coupled wheels. Instead, Beatty decided that more powerful locomotives could be designed by using the wide and deep firebox which he had used in his Karoo Class locomotives and the Cape 10th Class therefore remained one of a kind.

=== South African Railways ===
When the Union of South Africa was established on 31 May 1910, the three Colonial government railways (CGR, NGR and Central South African Railways) were united under a single administration to control and administer the railways, ports and harbours of the Union. Although the South African Railways and Harbours came into existence in 1910, the actual classification and renumbering of all the rolling stock of the three constituent railways were only implemented with effect from 1 January 1912.

In 1912, the Cape 10th Class was designated Class Experimental 6 and renumbered to 1244 on the South African Railways. It was withdrawn from service in 1938.
