= South African Class 6Y 2-6-2 =

1903 design of steam locomotive

CGR 6th Class 2-6-2 SAR Class 6Y 2-6-2
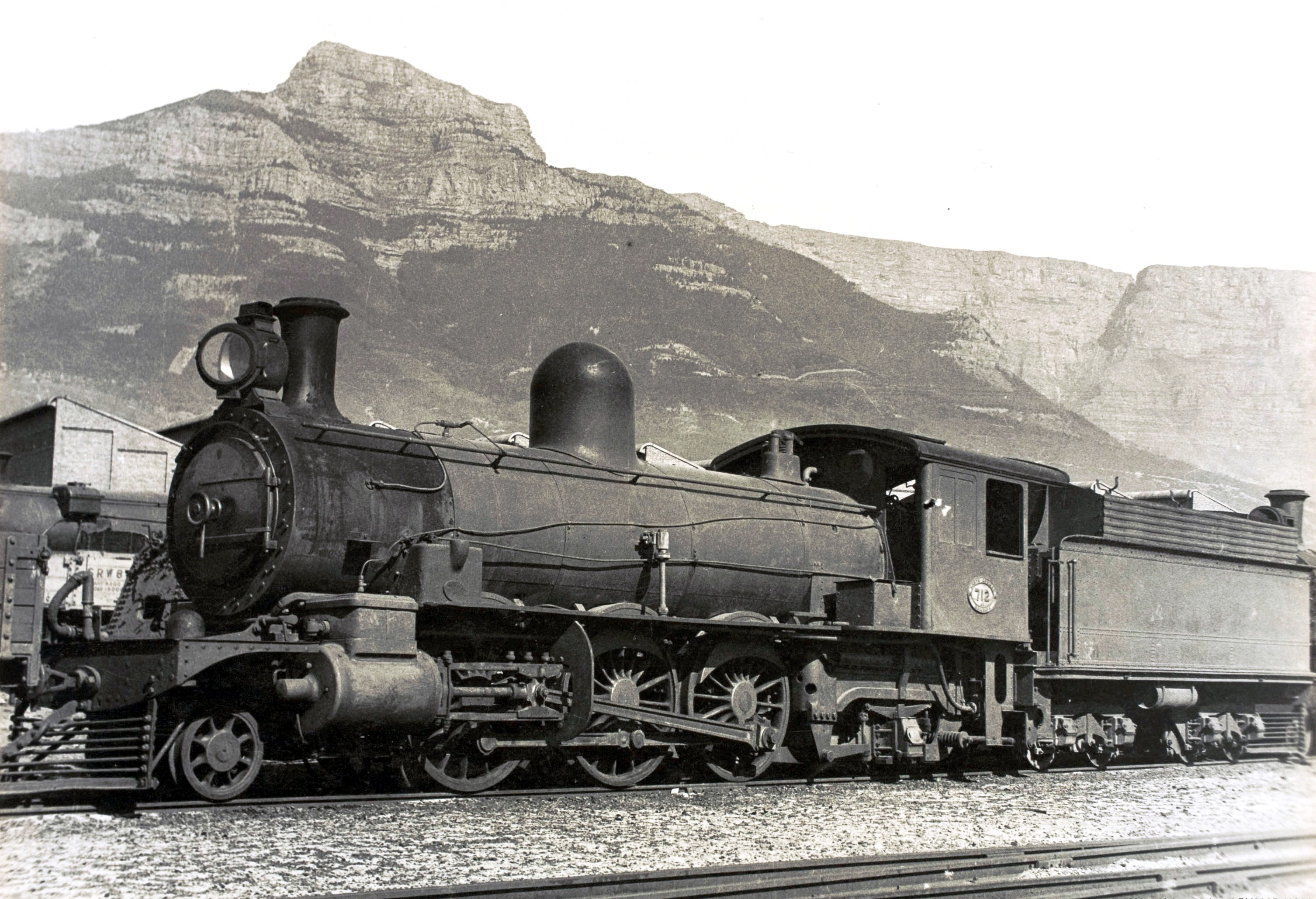
- No. 712 at Paardeneiland, c. 1930
Type and origin
- Power type: Steam
- Designer: Cape Government Railways (H.M. Beatty)
- Builder: Kitson and Company
- Serial number: 4191–4192
- Model: CGR 6th Class 2-6-2
- Build date: 1903
- Total produced: 2
Specifications
- Configuration
  - Whyte: 2-6-2 (Prairie)
  - UIC: 1'C1'n2
- Driver: 3rd coupled axle
- Gauge: 3 ft 6 in (1,067 mm) Cape gauge
- Leading dia.: 28 1/2 in (724 mm)
- Coupled dia.: 60 in (1,524 mm)
- Trailing dia.: 33 in (838 mm)
- Tender wheels: 37 in (940 mm)
- Wheelbase: 46 ft 7 5/8 in (14,214 mm)
  - Axle spacing (Asymmetrical): 1-2: 5 ft 7 in (1,702 mm); 2-3: 5 ft 3 in (1,600 mm)
  - Engine: 25 ft 9 in (7,849 mm)
  - Coupled: 10 ft 10 in (3,302 mm)
  - Tender: 10 ft (3,048 mm)
- Length
  - Over couplers: 56 ft 5 3/4 in (17,215 mm)
- Height: 12 ft 10 in (3,912 mm)
- Frame type: Bar
- Axle load: 14 LT 3 cwt (14,380 kg)
  - Leading: 5 LT 11 cwt (5,639 kg)
  - 1st coupled: 11 LT 12 cwt (11,790 kg)
  - 2nd coupled: 13 LT 6 cwt (13,510 kg)
  - 3rd coupled: 14 LT 3 cwt (14,380 kg)
  - Trailing: 11 LT 10 cwt (11,680 kg)
  - Tender axle: Axle 1: 10 LT 8 cwt (10,570 kg); Axle 2: 10 LT 15 cwt (10,920 kg); Axle 3: 10 LT 17 cwt (11,020 kg)
- Adhesive weight: 39 LT 1 cwt (39,680 kg)
- Loco weight: 56 LT 12 cwt (57,510 kg)
- Tender weight: 32 LT (32,510 kg)
- Total weight: 88 LT 12 cwt (90,020 kg)
- Tender type: YE (3-axle)
- Fuel type: Coal
- Fuel capacity: 5 LT 10 cwt (5.6 t)
- Water cap.: 2,825 imp gal (12,800 L)
- Firebox
  - Type: Round-top
  - Grate area: 26 sq ft (2.4 m^{2})
- Boiler
  - Pitch: 7 ft 1/2 in (2,146 mm)
  - Diameter: 4 ft 7 3/4 in (1,416 mm)
  - Tube plates: 14 ft 6 1/4 in (4,426 mm)
  - Small tubes: 178: 2 in (51 mm)
- Boiler pressure: 180 psi (1,241 kPa)
- Safety valve: Ramsbottom
- Heating surface
  - Firebox: 110 sq ft (10 m^{2})
  - Tubes: 1,397 sq ft (129.8 m^{2})
  - Total surface: 1,507 sq ft (140.0 m^{2})
- Cylinders: Two
- Cylinder size: 18 1/2 in (470 mm) bore 26 in (660 mm) stroke
- Valve gear: Stephenson
- Couplers: Johnston link-and-pin
Performance figures
- Tractive effort: 20,030 lbf (89.1 kN) @ 75%
Career
- Operators: Cape Government Railways; South African Railways
- Class: CGR 6th Class 2-6-2; SAR Class 6Y
- Number in class: 2
- Numbers: CGR 901-902; SAR 711-712
- Delivered: 1903
- First run: 1903
- Withdrawn: 1934
- The 2nd coupled axle had flangeless wheels

The South African Railways Class 6Y 2-6-2 of 1903 was a steam locomotive from the pre-Union era in the Cape of Good Hope.

In 1903, the Cape Government Railways placed two 6th Class steam locomotives with a 2-6-2 Prairie type wheel arrangement in service. In 1912, when these locomotives were assimilated into the South African Railways, they were renumbered and designated Class 6Y.

== Manufacturer ==
The Cape 6th Class 2-6-2 Prairie type locomotive was designed at the Salt River works of the Cape Government Railways (CGR) and was a further development of the 6th Class 2-6-4 Adriatic type. The 2-6-4 locomotive itself came about as an experimental development of the very successful 6th Class 4-6-0 locomotive and was initially also built with a 2-6-2 Prairie wheel arrangement, but eventually modified to a 2-6-4 wheel arrangement.

=== Development ===
Good though the 6th Class 4-6-0 locomotives were, the requirement grew for larger and more powerful engines. It was becoming increasingly apparent at the time that such locomotives would require fireboxes with larger grate areas, which was not possible with the existing type of frame.

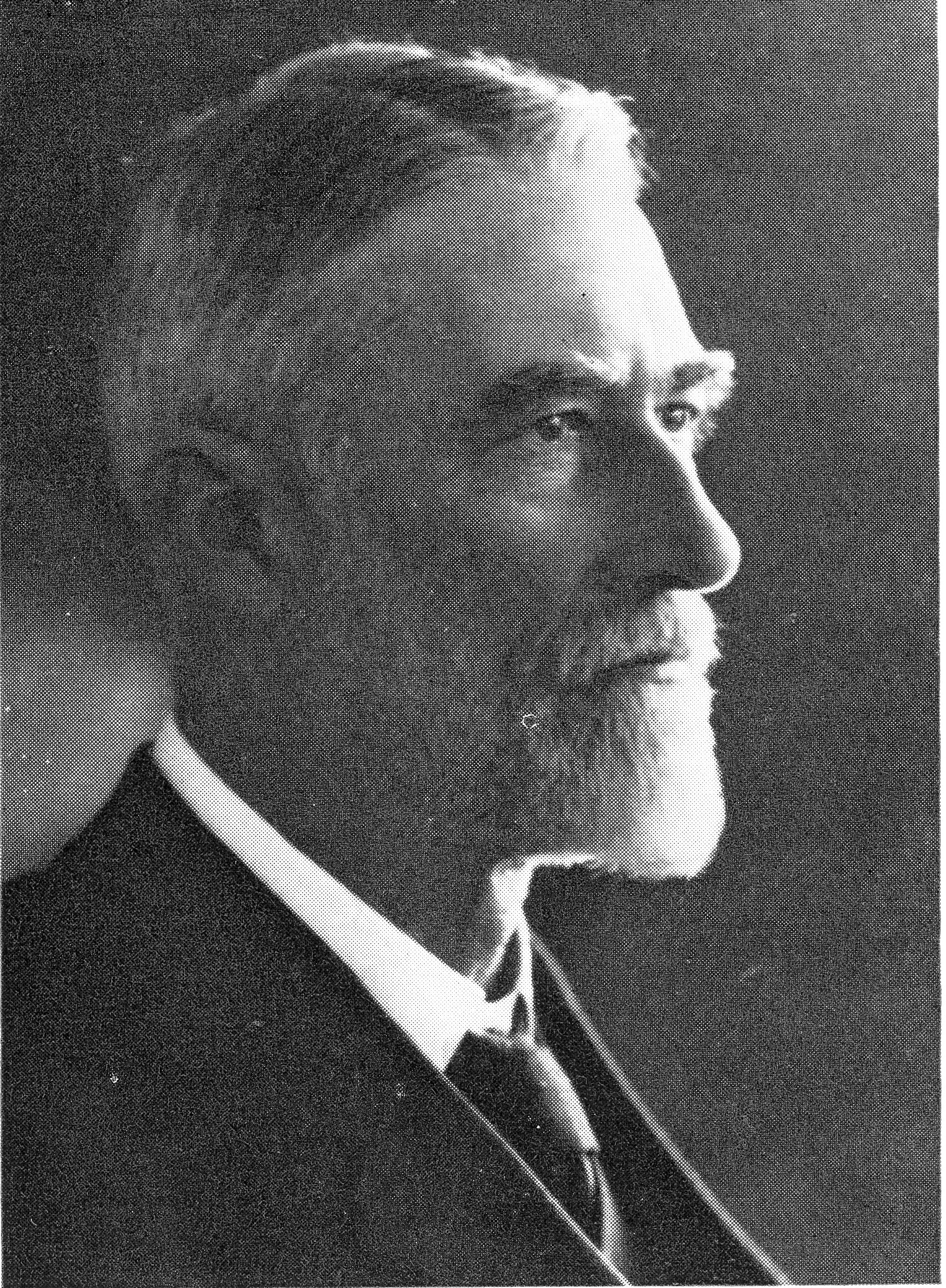
H.M. Beatty

To overcome this problem, CGR Chief Locomotive Superintendent H.M. Beatty prepared designs for a new locomotive with a 2-6-2 Prairie wheel arrangement in which the frame terminated in front of the firebox, where it connected to a casting which he termed the "bridle casting". This casting extended out on either side and had wider spaced frames attached to it, which allowed a wider and deeper firebox.

Because of the widened frames and larger firebox, trailing carrier wheels were incorporated to take the weight of the firebox. The coupled wheels were also located further forward to accommodate the deeper firebox and, as a result, the leading bogie was replaced by a single axle bissel truck.

The first four locomotives of this design, later to be designated Class 6Z by the South African Railways (SAR), were placed in service in 1901. They displayed a tendency to be unsteady at speed and the design was therefore modified to a 2-6-4 Adriatic type wheel arrangement. Another four locomotives which incorporated this improvement were ordered in 1902, while the first four locomotives were modified accordingly.

In spite of their totally different appearance and wheel arrangement, the CGR designated them as 6th Class as well, possibly because they were intended as an improved 6th Class.

=== Redesign ===
With an improved design of bissel truck, another two locomotives were ordered from Kitson and Company in 1903 and were once again built with a 2-6-2 Prairie wheel arrangement. They had larger boilers as well as larger 60-inch diameter (1,524-millimetre) coupled wheels, compared to the 54-inch diameter (1,372-millimetre) coupled wheels of all other 6th Class locomotives. Numbered 901 and 902 for the Western System of the CGR, these two engines did not display the tendency to sway at speed and therefore retained their 2-6-2 wheel arrangement.

== Class 6 sub-classes ==
When the Union of South Africa was established on 31 May 1910, the three Colonial government railways (CGR, Natal Government Railways and Central South African Railways) were united under a single administration to control and administer the railways, ports and harbours of the Union. Although the South African Railways and Harbours came into existence in 1910, the actual classification and renumbering of all the rolling stock of the three constituent railways were only implemented with effect from 1 January 1912.

In 1912, these two locomotives were renumbered 711 and 712 and designated Class 6Y on the SAR. The rest of the CGR's 6th Class locomotives, together with the Central South African Railways Classes 6-L1 to 6-L3 locomotives which had been inherited from the Oranje-Vrijstaat Gouwermentspoorwegen via the Imperial Military Railways, were grouped into thirteen more sub-classes by the SAR. The 4-6-0 locomotives became SAR Classes 6, 6A to 6H and 6J to 6L, and the eight 2-6-4 locomotives became Class 6Z.

== Service ==
In service, these two locomotives proved to be very successful, being fast, powerful, and good steamers. The experience which was gained with these two engines led to the introduction of the Karoo Class 4-6-2 Pacific type later in 1903. The two engines spent practically their entire working lives on the Cape mainline in the Karoo region, until they were withdrawn and scrapped in 1934.

== Illustration ==
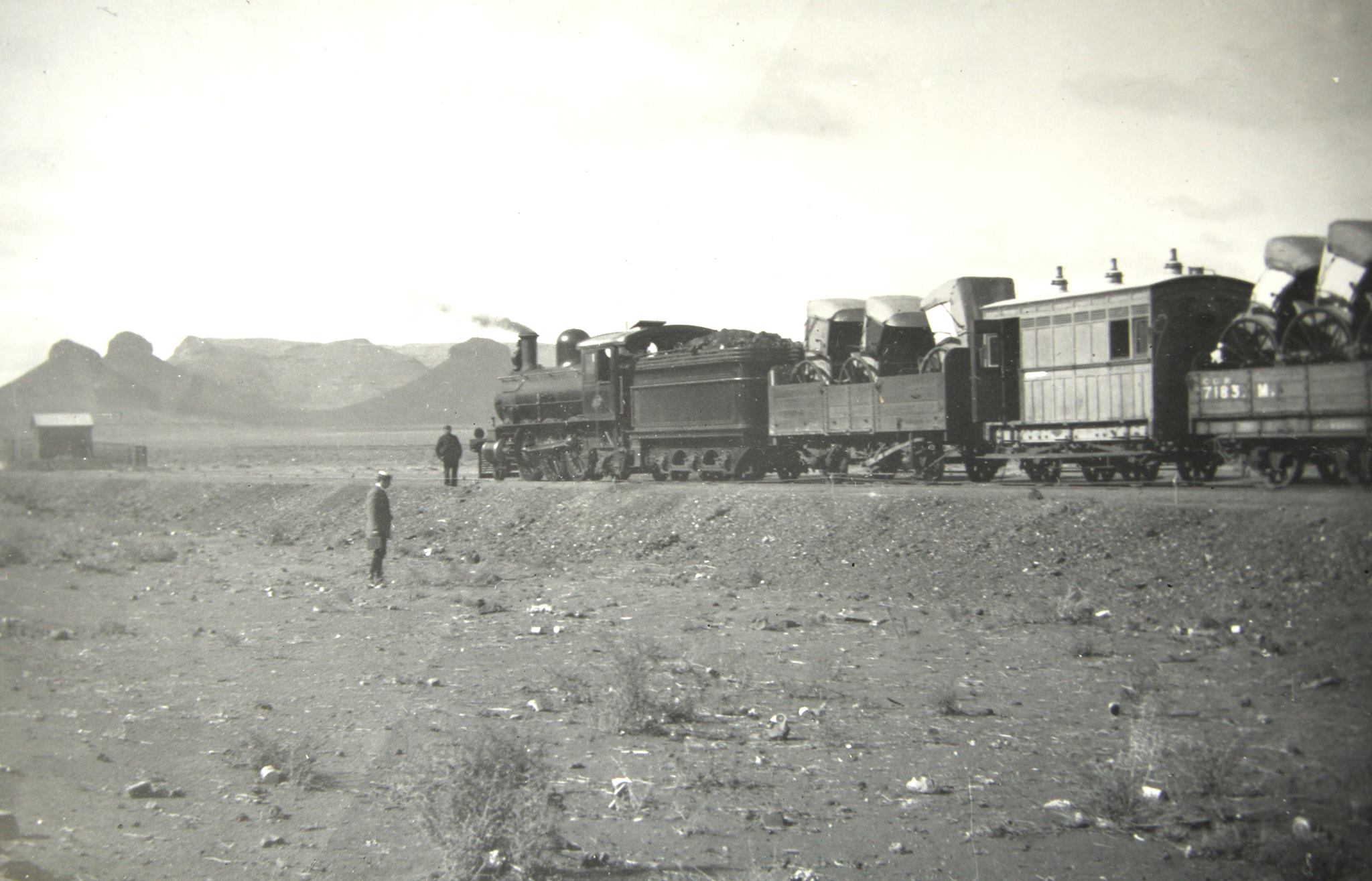
CGR 6th Class 2-6-2 at Three Sisters, c. 1905

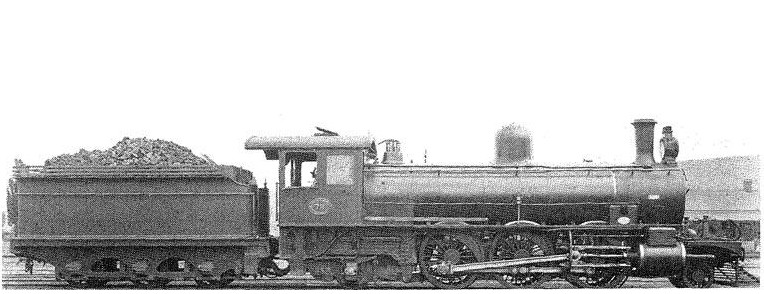
Ex CGR 6th Class no. 901, SAR Class 6Y no. 711, at Touws River, c. 1930

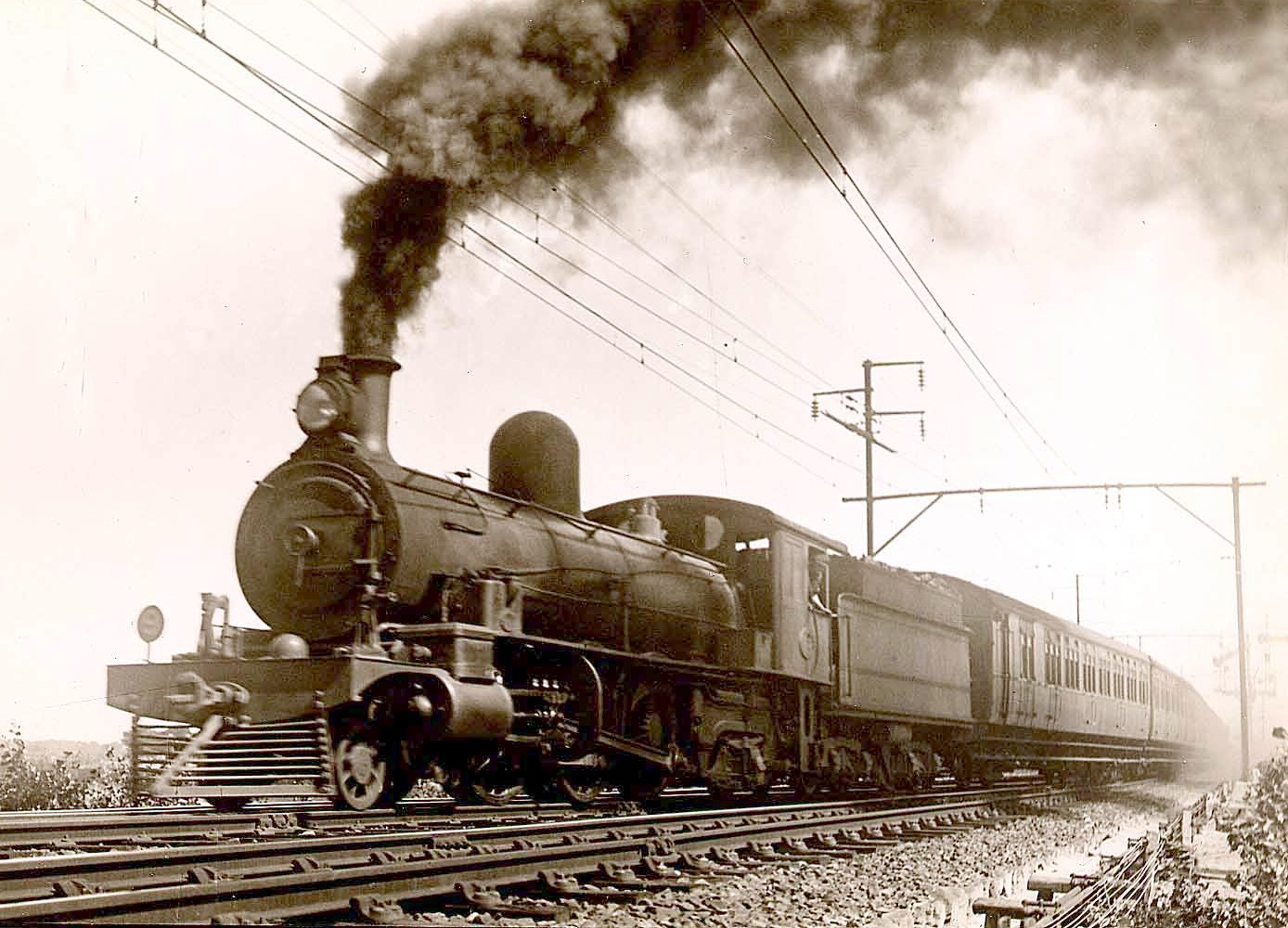
Ex CGR 6th Class 2-6-2, SAR Class 6Y, c. 1930
