= South African Class 6J 4-6-0 =

1902 design of steam locomotive

CGR 6th Class 4-6-0 1902 South African Class 6J 4-6-0
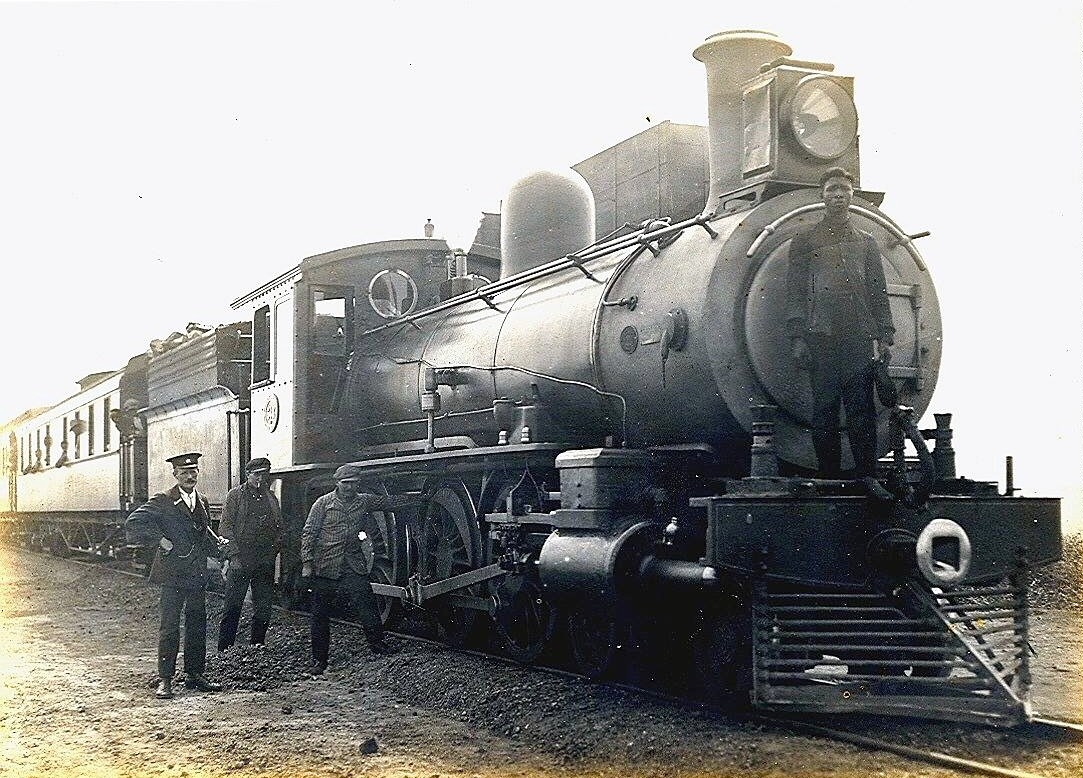
- SAR Class 6J, c. 1912
Type and origin
- Power type: Steam
- Designer: Cape Government Railways (H.M. Beatty)
- Builder: Neilson, Reid and Company
- Serial number: 6089–6102
- Model: CGR 6th Class
- Build date: 1902
- Total produced: 14
Specifications
- Configuration
  - Whyte: 4-6-0 (Tenwheeler)
  - UIC: 2'Cn2
- Driver: 2nd coupled axle
- Gauge: 3 ft 6 in (1,067 mm) Cape gauge
- Leading dia.: 28 1/2 in (724 mm)
- Coupled dia.: 54 in (1,372 mm)
- Tender wheels: 33 1/2 in (851 mm) as built 34 in (864 mm) retyred
- Wheelbase: 45 ft 8 1/2 in (13,932 mm)
  - Axle spacing (Asymmetrical): 1-2: 4 ft 9 in (1,448 mm); 2-3: 6 ft 7 in (2,007 mm)
  - Engine: 20 ft 8 in (6,299 mm)
  - Leading: 5 ft 6 in (1,676 mm)
  - Coupled: 11 ft 4 in (3,454 mm)
  - Tender: 14 ft 7 in (4,445 mm)
  - Tender bogie: 4 ft 7 in (1,397 mm)
- Length
  - Over couplers: 53 ft (16,154 mm)
- Height: 12 ft (3,658 mm)
- Frame type: Bar
- Axle load: 13 LT 8 cwt (13,620 kg)
  - Leading: 10 LT 18 cwt (11,070 kg)
  - 1st coupled: 12 LT 5 cwt (12,450 kg)
  - 2nd coupled: 13 LT 8 cwt (13,620 kg)
  - 3rd coupled: 12 LT 5 cwt (12,450 kg)
  - Tender bogie: Bogie 1: 16 LT 15 cwt (17,020 kg); Bogie 2: 17 LT 8 cwt (17,680 kg)
  - Tender axle: 8 LT 14 cwt (8,840 kg)
- Adhesive weight: 37 LT 18 cwt (38,510 kg)
- Loco weight: 48 LT 16 cwt (49,580 kg)
- Tender weight: 34 LT 3 cwt (34,700 kg)
- Total weight: 82 LT 19 cwt (84,280 kg)
- Tender type: XD (2-axle bogies); XC, XC1, XD, XE, XE1, XF, XF1, XF2, XJ, XM, XM1, XM2, XM3, XM4 permitted
- Fuel type: Coal
- Fuel capacity: 5 LT 10 cwt (5.6 t)
- Water cap.: 2,730 imp gal (12,400 L)
- Firebox
  - Type: Round-top
  - Grate area: 18.75 sq ft (1.742 m^{2})
- Boiler
  - Pitch: 6 ft 9 1/2 in (2,070 mm)
  - Diameter: 4 ft 7 in (1,397 mm)
  - Tube plates: 11 ft 2 1/8 in (3,407 mm)
  - Small tubes: 182: 2 in (51 mm)
- Boiler pressure: 180 psi (1,241 kPa)
- Safety valve: Ramsbottom
- Heating surface
  - Firebox: 107.6 sq ft (10.00 m^{2})
  - Tubes: 1,065 sq ft (98.9 m^{2})
  - Total surface: 1,172.6 sq ft (108.94 m^{2})
- Cylinders: Two
- Cylinder size: 17 in (432 mm) bore 26 in (660 mm) stroke
- Valve gear: Stephenson
- Couplers: Johnston link-and-pin AAR knuckle (1930s)
Performance figures
- Tractive effort: 18,780 lbf (83.5 kN) @ 75%
Career
- Operators: Cape Government Railways; South African Railways
- Class: CGR 6th Class, SAR Class 6J
- Number in class: 14
- Numbers: CGR 155, 160, 287-294, 537-540; SAR 635-648
- Delivered: 1902
- First run: 1902
- Withdrawn: 1972

The South African Railways Class 6J 4-6-0 of 1902 was a steam locomotive from the pre-Union era in the Cape of Good Hope.

In 1902, fourteen 6th Class bar framed steam locomotives with a 4-6-0 wheel arrangement were placed in service by the Cape Government Railways. In 1912, when they were assimilated into the South African Railways, they were renumbered and designated Class 6J.

== Manufacturer ==
The original 6th Class locomotive had been designed at the Salt River works of the Cape Government Railways (CGR) in 1892 by H.M. Beatty, at the time the Cape Government Railways (Western System) Locomotive Superintendent.

The fourteen 6th Class locomotives which were placed in service by the CGR in 1902 were built by Neilson, Reid and Company.

== Characteristics ==
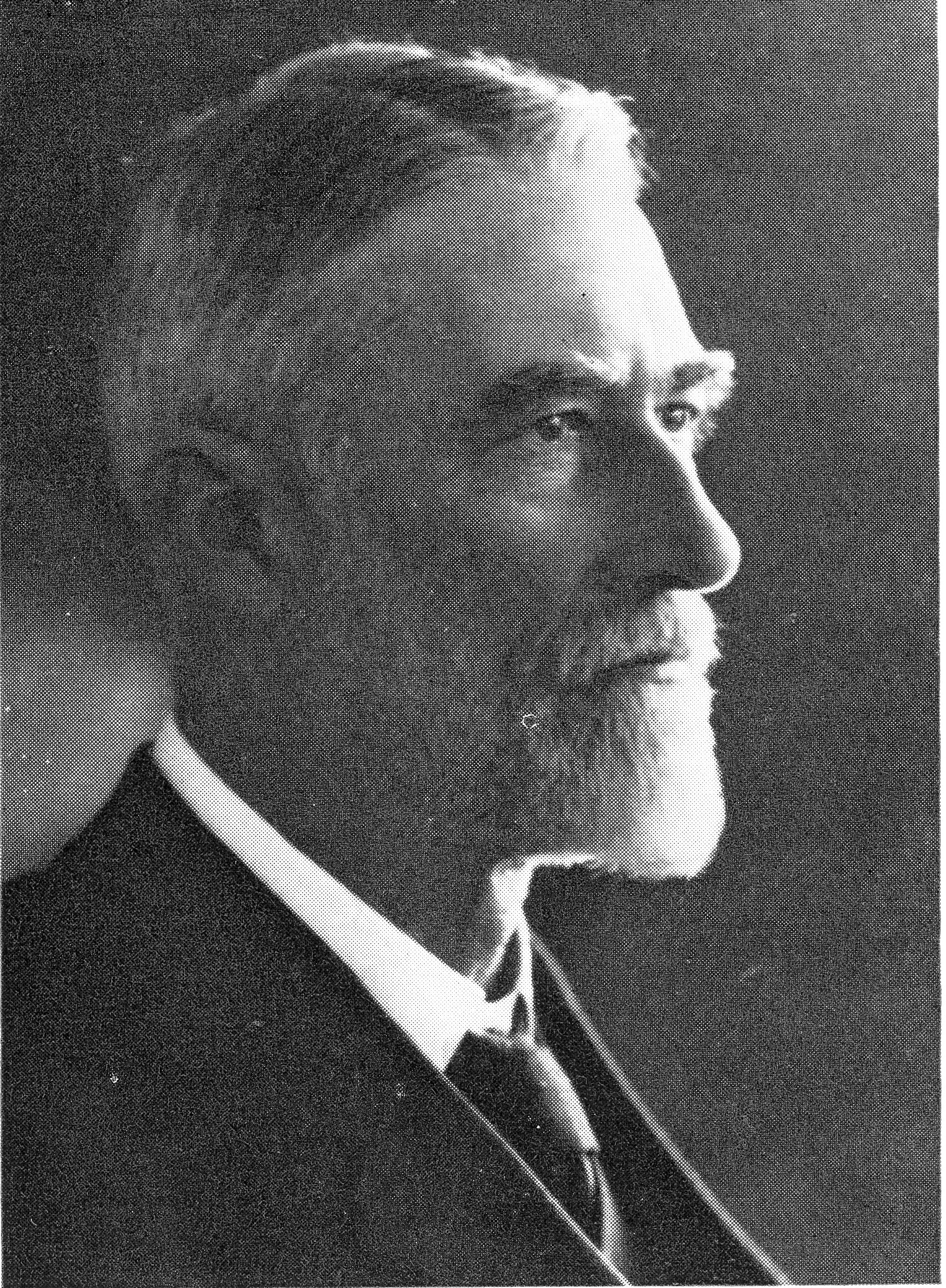
H.M. Beatty

The locomotives were practically identical to the two bar-framed locomotives which had been built by Sharp, Stewart and Company in 1900 and which became the South African Railways (SAR) Class 6F in 1912. They were visually identifiable as second-generation bar-framed 6th Class locomotives by their running boards, which were mounted above the coupled wheels without the need for wheel fairings.

As built, the smokebox was equipped with openings on its sides, near the front, with covers which each had a handle by which it could be opened with a half turn to give direct access to the inside of the smokebox. This was most likely to facilitate cleaning of the spark arrestor screens to overcome clogging without having to open the smokebox door. The cover handles were attached to the smokebox side by a small chain, as shown in the main picture. Judging from photographs, these covers were removed and the openings closed off in the SAR era.

== Distribution ==
Four of the locomotives were numbered in the range from 537 to 540 for the Midland System of the CGR. The other ten were numbered 155, 160 and in the range from 287 to 294 for the Western System.

It would appear that the CGR's Western System was more concerned with having unbroken number ranges than the CGR itself was about allocating different classifications to dissimilar locomotives, even when they had different wheel arrangements. Of these Western System engine numbers, 155 and 160 had been used before on two 6th Class locomotives which had been sold to the Oranje-Vrijstaat Gouwerment-Spoorwegen (OVGS) in 1897.

== Class 6 sub-classes ==
When the Union of South Africa was established on 31 May 1910, the three Colonial government railways (CGR, Natal Government Railways and Central South African Railways) were united under a single administration to control and administer the railways, ports and harbours of the Union. Although the South African Railways and Harbours came into existence in 1910, the actual classification and renumbering of all the rolling stock of the three constituent railways were only implemented with effect from 1 January 1912.

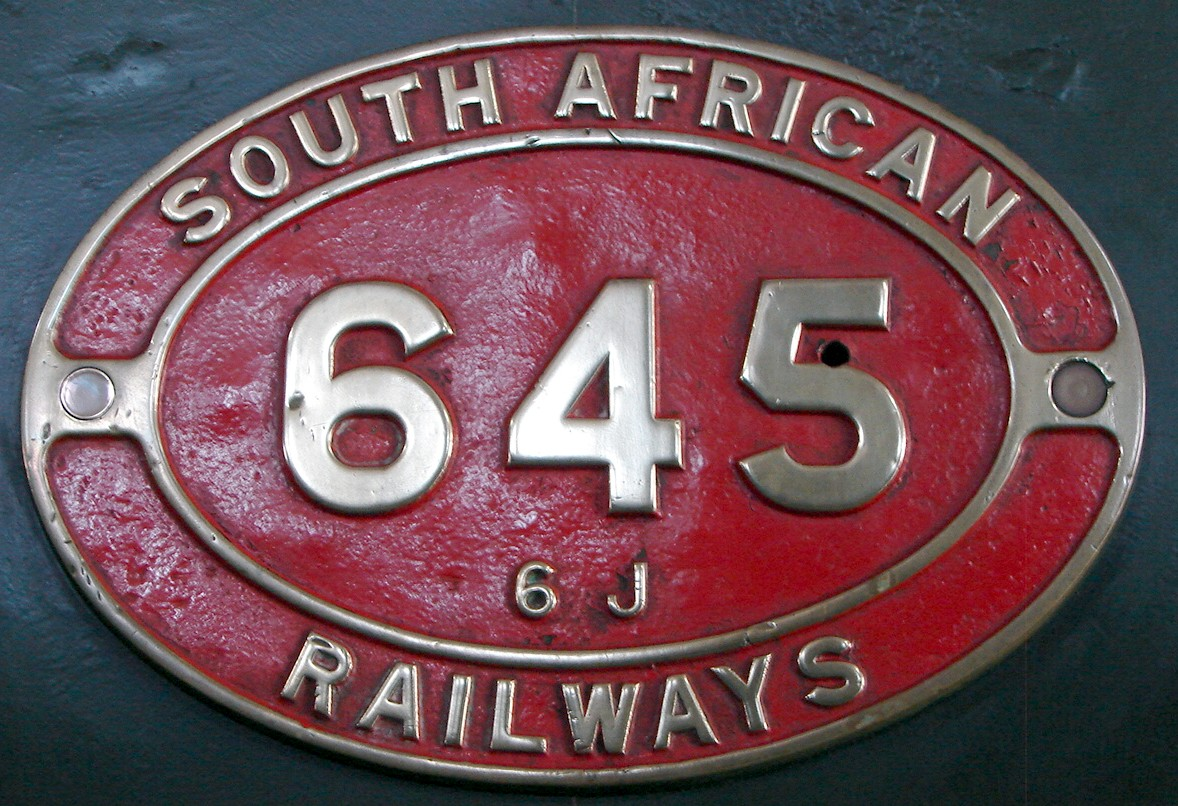
6J 645 numberplate

When these fourteen locomotives were assimilated into the SAR in 1912, they were renumbered in the range from 635 to 648 and designated Class 6J.

The rest of the CGR's 6th Class locomotives, together with the Central South African Railways Classes 6-L1 to 6-L3 locomotives which had been inherited from the OVGS via the Imperial Military Railways (IMR), were grouped into thirteen more sub-classes by the SAR. The 4-6-0 locomotives became SAR Classes 6, 6A to 6H, 6K and 6L, the 2-6-2 locomotives were designated Class 6Y and the 2-6-4 locomotives were designated Class 6Z.

== Service ==
The Class 6J has been described as the most successful of the bar-framed 6th Class locomotives. The CGR placed them in service on the Cape mainline and for several years they hauled the Dining Car Express Train which left Cape Town every Wednesday morning for the Orange River Colony and Johannesburg in Transvaal, running via De Aar, Noupoort and Springfontein.

The last Class 6J locomotive was withdrawn from service in Bethlehem in 1972.

== Renumbering ==
The table lists the Class 6J works numbers and renumbering.

Class 6J 4-6-0 Works numbers & renumbering
Works no.	CGR no.	CGR Sys.	SAR no.	Notes
6097	155	W	635	See Class 6
6098	160	W	636	See Class 6
6089	287	W	637	
6090	288	W	638	
6091	289	W	639	
6092	290	W	640	
6093	291	W	641	
6094	292	W	642	
6095	293	W	643	
6096	294	W	644	
6099	537	M	645	
6100	538	M	646	
6101	539	M	647	
6102	540	M	648	

== Preservation ==
Two members of the Class 6J survive.

- No. 641 is in storage at Epping Market Siding in Cape Town.
- No. 645 is on display at the Outeniqua Transport Museum in George.

== Illustration ==
The main picture shows a Class 6J, with conductor Fred Hart, an unknown stoker, driver Jim-Boy Barlow and an unknown cleaner. The picture dates to c. 1912, judging by the SAR-style cabside number plates, but still with a CGR-style cowcatcher.

The first picture below shows Western System 6th Class no. 292, later renumbered to SAR Class 6J no. 642, painted in the CGR's green livery on the Cape's Dining Car Express Train. It is a colourised photograph which was used as a post card, on which some artistic licence had been used with red wheels and a red headlight reflector. Also illustrated is a first class annual season ticket issued to Mr. W. Smith on 25 January 1909, which allowed the holder to travel between Cape Town and Hopefield, Eendekuil, Caledon, Franschhoek, Carnarvon, Prieska and Vryburg, literally all over the Western System lines in the present-day Western Cape and Northern Cape Provinces.

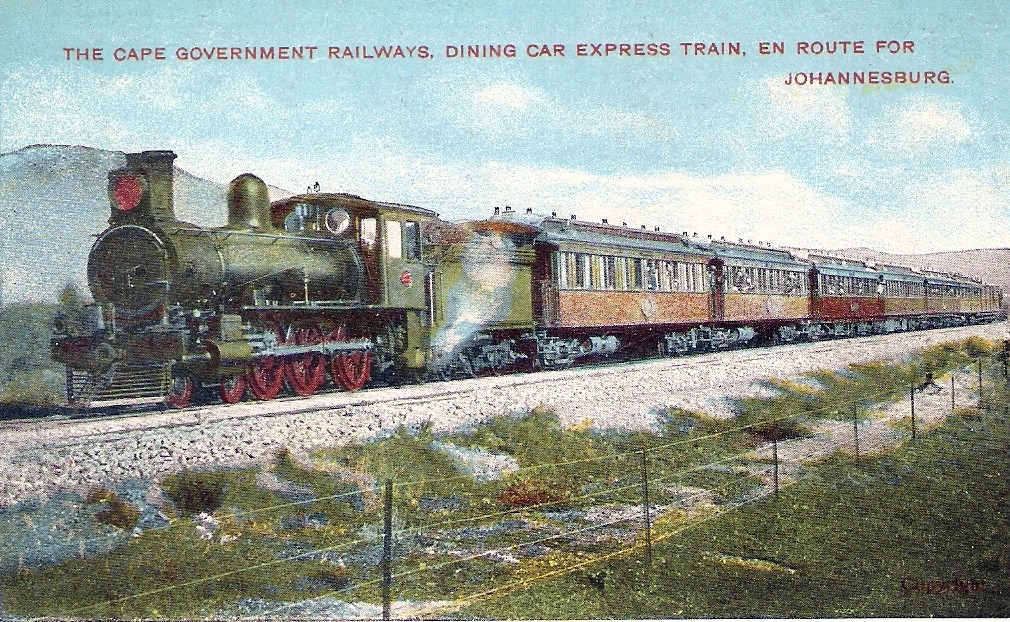
Ex CGR no. 292, SAR Class 6J no. 642

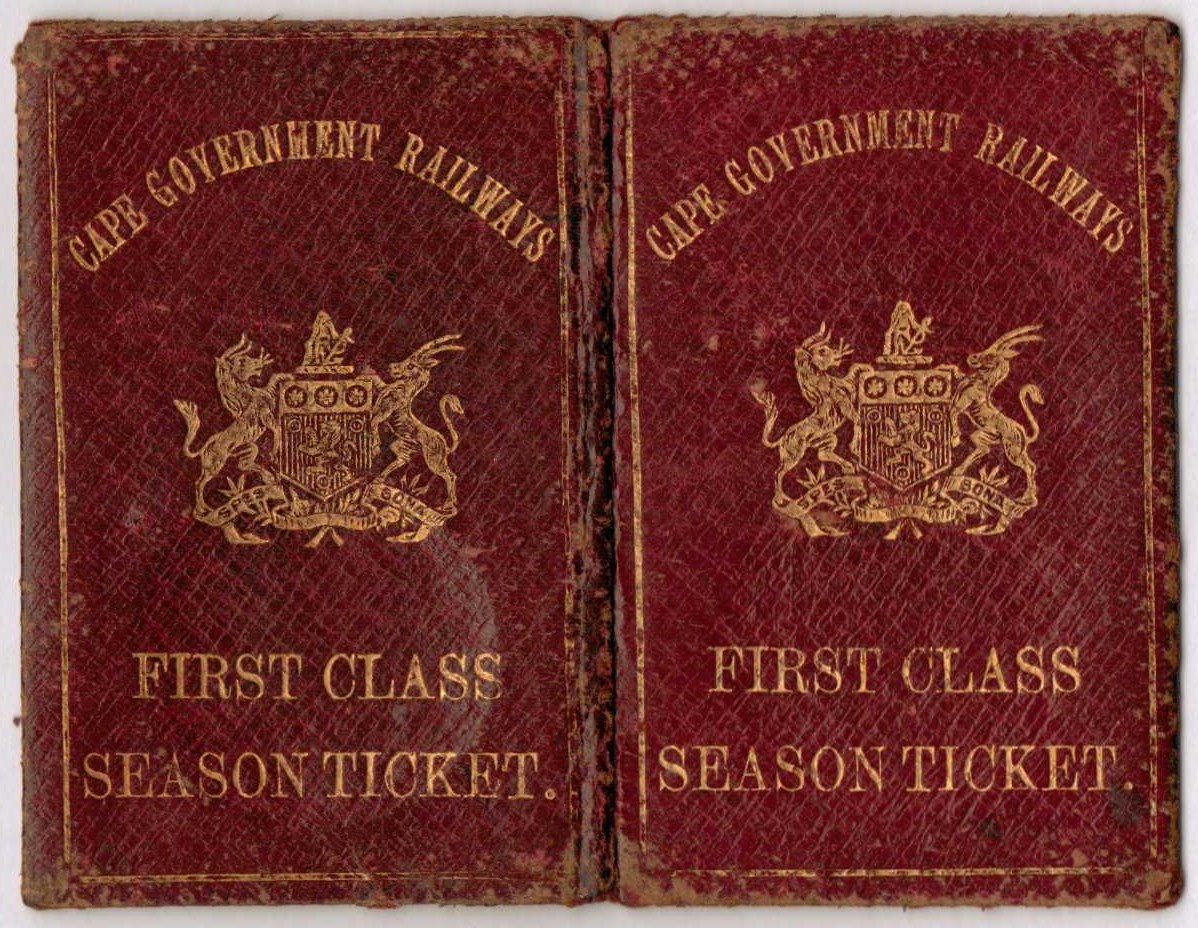
First class season ticket cover

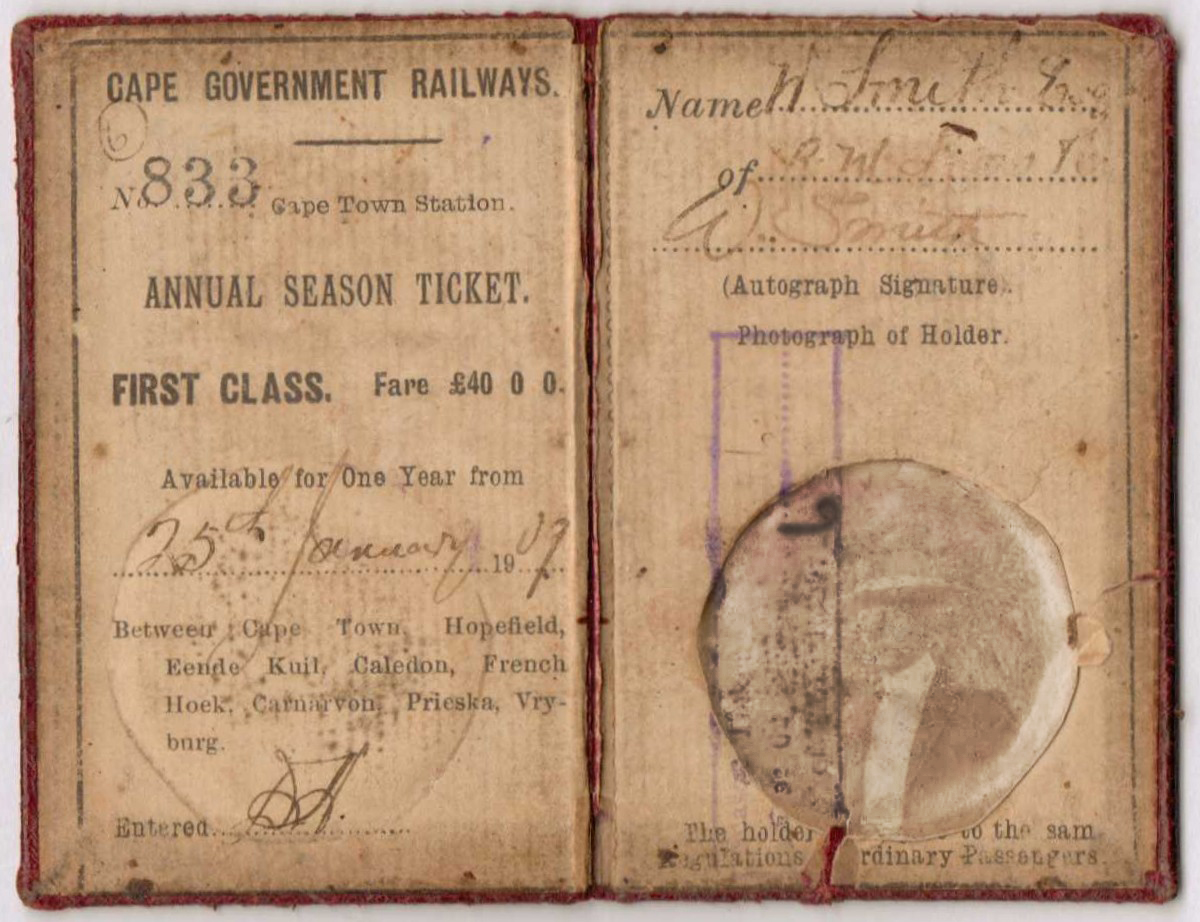
First class season ticket inside

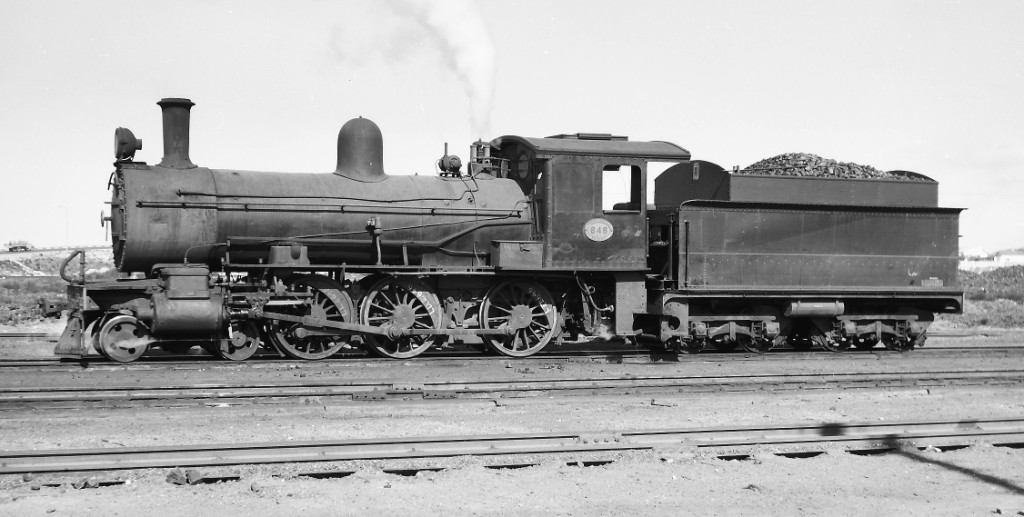
Ex CGR no. 538, SAR Class 6J no. 646

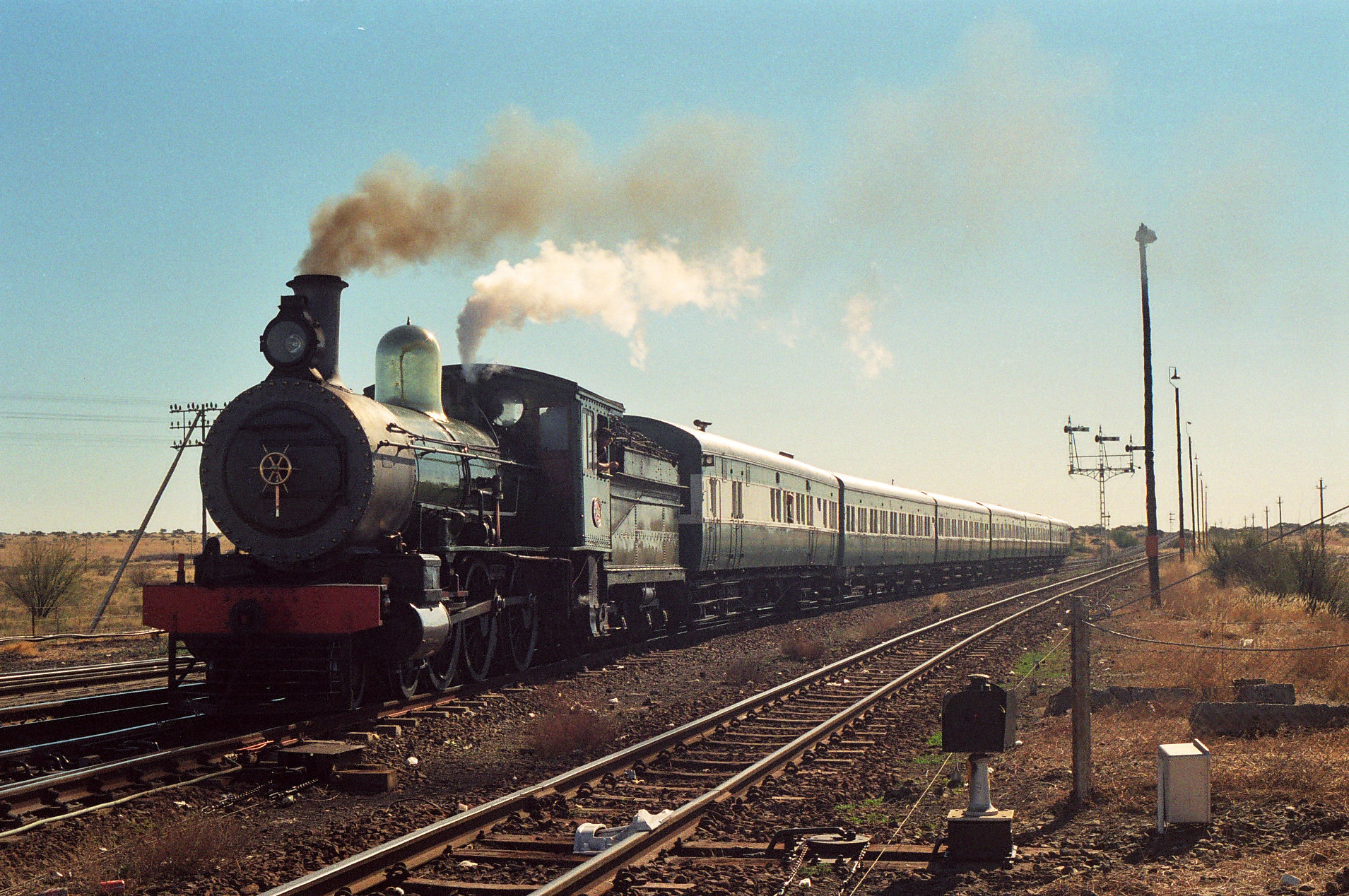
Class 6J 645 on the Kimberley De Aar Line – 1 January 1990

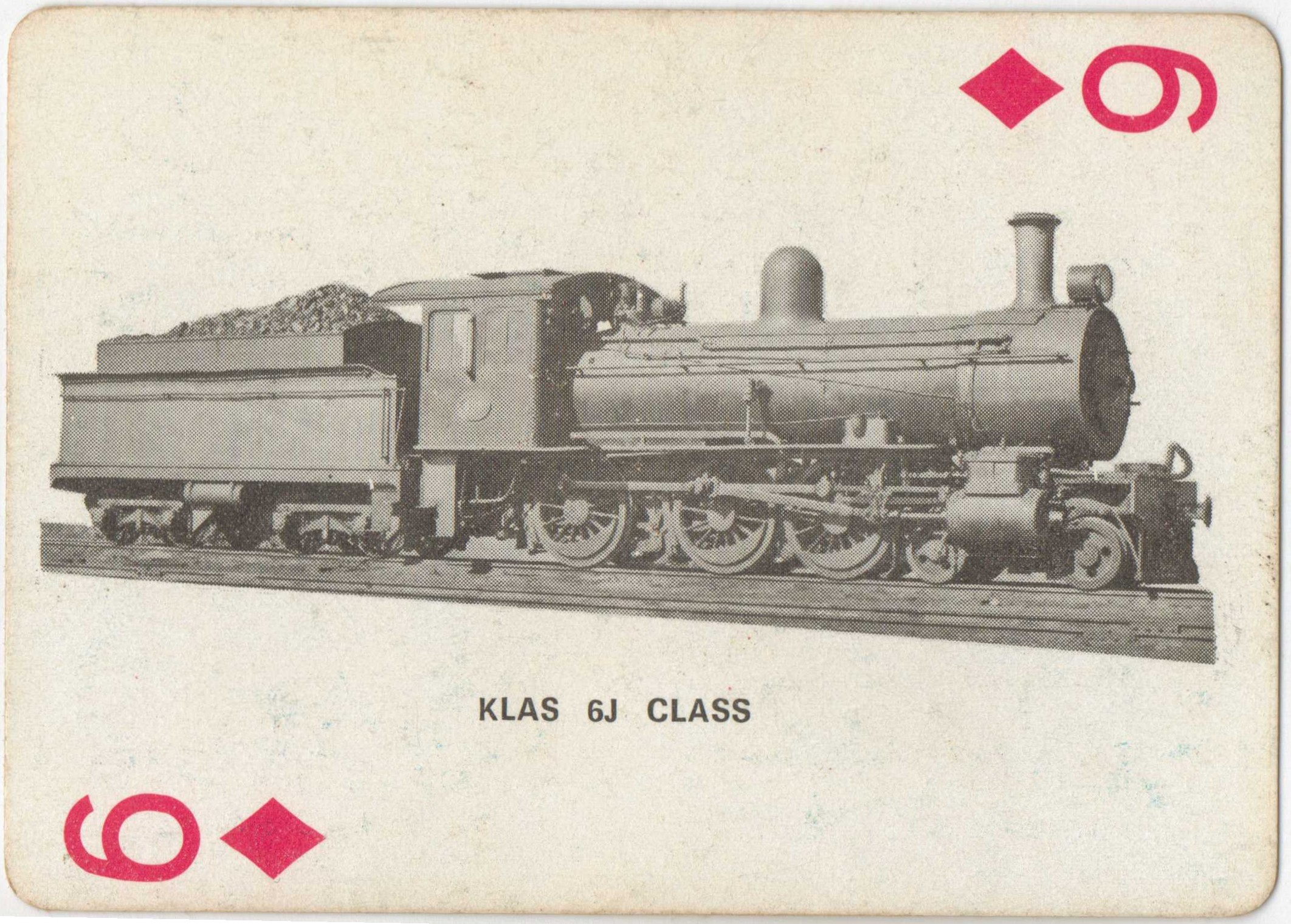
Class 6J SAR Museum Playing Card

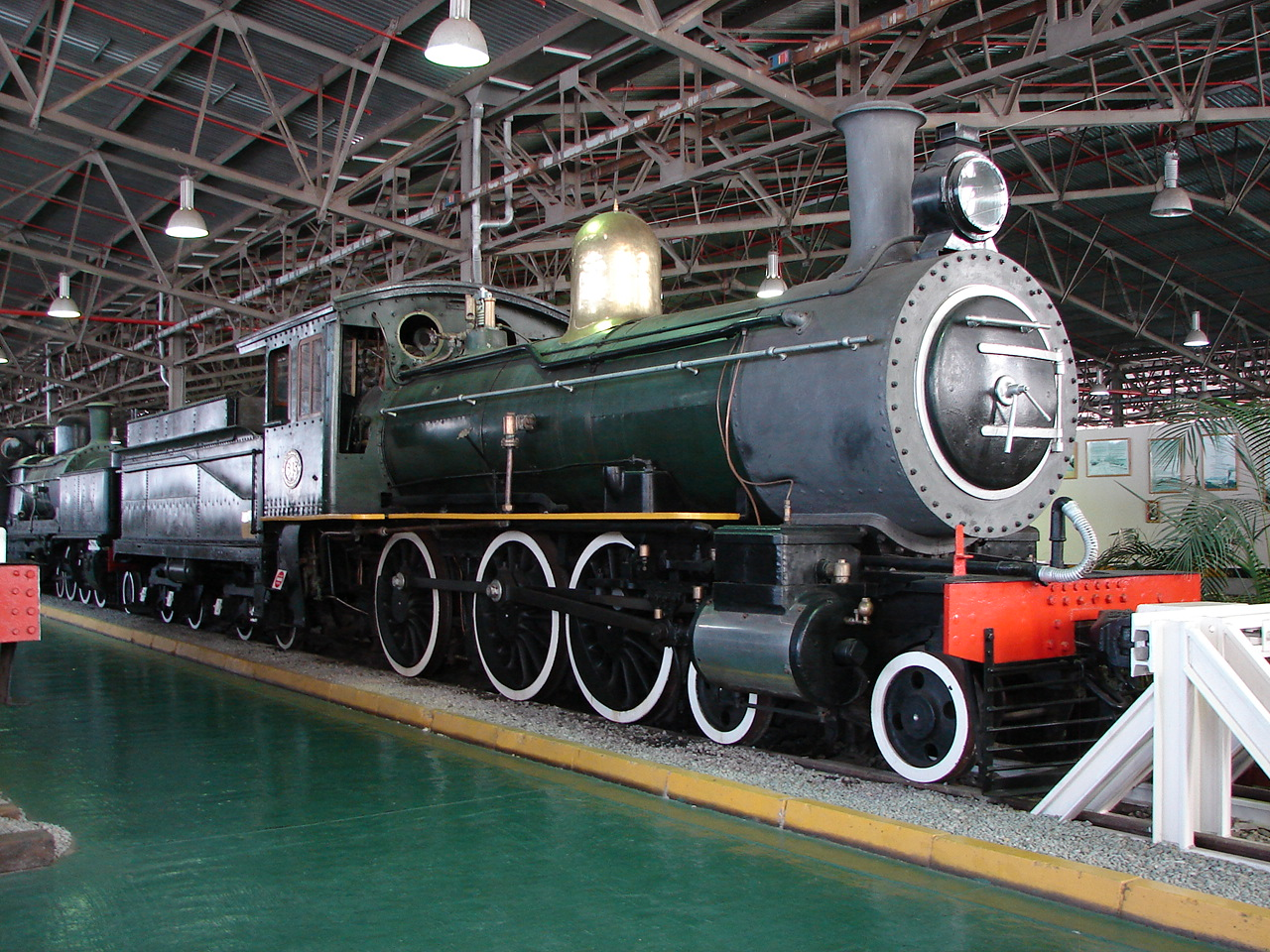
Class 6J no. 645, Outeniqua Transport Museum
