= South African Class 6 4-6-0 =

1893 design of steam locomotive

CGR 6th Class 4-6-0 1893 OVGS 6th Class L 4-6-0 CSAR Class 6-L1 4-6-0 South African Class 6 4-6-0
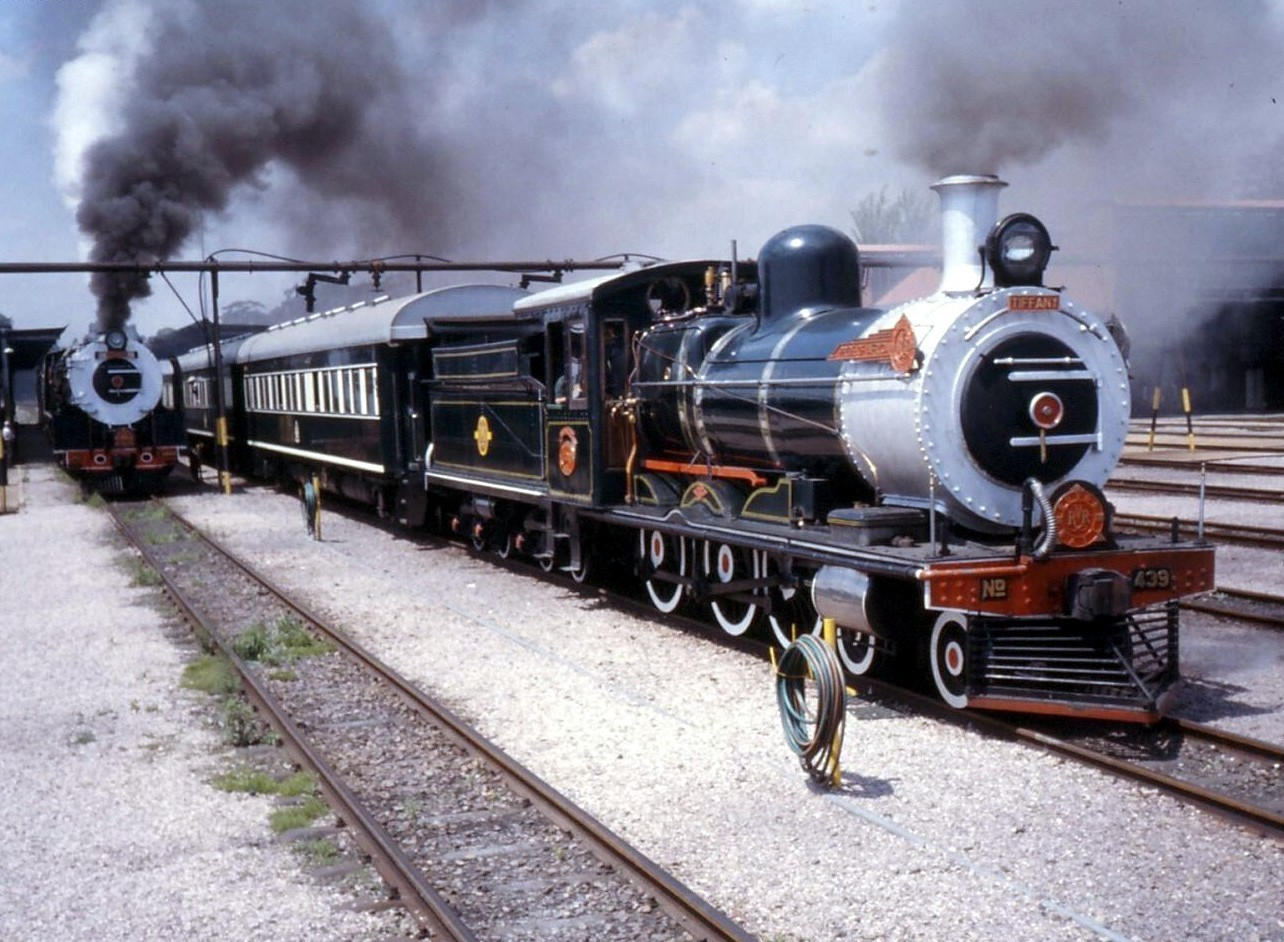
- No. 439, Capital Park, 24 September 2000
Type and origin
- ♠ Original locomotive, as built ♥ Locomotive rebuilt with Belpaire firebox
- Power type: Steam
- Designer: Cape Government Railways (H.M. Beatty)
- Builder: Dübs and Company
- Serial number: 3050–3073, 3087–3102
- Model: CGR 6th
- Build date: 1893–1894
- Total produced: 40
Specifications
- Configuration
  - Whyte: 4-6-0 (Tenwheeler)
  - UIC: 2'Cn2
- Driver: 2nd coupled axle
- Gauge: 3 ft 6 in (1,067 mm) Cape gauge
- Leading dia.: 28 1/2 in (724 mm)
- Coupled dia.: 54 in (1,372 mm)
- Tender wheels: 37 in (940 mm)
- Wheelbase: 41 ft 9 1/8 in (12,729 mm)
  - Axle spacing (Asymmetrical): 1-2: 4 ft 9 in (1,448 mm); 2-3: 6 ft 3 in (1,905 mm)
  - Engine: 20 ft 3 1/4 in (6,179 mm)
  - Leading: 5 ft 4 1/2 in (1,638 mm)
  - Coupled: 11 ft (3,353 mm)
  - Tender: 10 ft (3,048 mm)
- Length
  - Over couplers: ♠ 50 ft 8 1/2 in (15,456 mm) ♥ 51 ft 7 1/4 in (15,729 mm)
- Height: ♠ 12 ft 8 in (3,861 mm) ♥ 12 ft 10 3/4 in (3,931 mm)
- Frame type: Plate
- Axle load: ♠ 11 LT 19 cwt 2 qtr (12,170 kg) ♥ 13 LT 8 cwt (13,620 kg)
  - Leading: ♠ 9 LT 15 cwt 2 qtr (9,932 kg) ♥ 10 LT 17 cwt 2 qtr (11,050 kg)
  - Coupled: ♥ 13 LT 8 cwt (13,620 kg)
  - 1st coupled: ♠ 10 LT 17 cwt 2 qtr (11,050 kg)
  - 2nd coupled: ♠ 11 LT 19 cwt 2 qtr (12,170 kg)
  - 3rd coupled: ♠ 11 LT 18 cwt 2 qtr (12,120 kg)
  - Tender axle: 9 LT 17 cwt (10,010 kg) average
- Adhesive weight: ♠ 34 LT 15 cwt 2 qtr (35,330 kg) ♥ 40 LT 1 cwt (40,690 kg)
- Loco weight: ♠ 44 LT 11 cwt (45,260 kg) ♥ 51 LT 1 cwt 2 qtr (51,890 kg)
- Tender weight: 29 LT 11 cwt (30,020 kg)
- Total weight: ♠ 74 LT 2 cwt (75,290 kg) ♥ 80 LT 12 cwt 2 qtr (81,920 kg)
- Tender type: YB (3-axle); YB, YC, YE, YE1 permitted
- Fuel type: Coal
- Fuel capacity: 5 LT 10 cwt (5.6 t)
- Water cap.: 2,370 imp gal (10,800 L)
- Firebox
  - Type: Round-top, Belpaire
  - Grate area: ♠ 16.8 sq ft (1.56 m^{2}) ♥ 16.6 sq ft (1.54 m^{2})
- Boiler
  - Pitch: ♠ 6 ft 6 in (1,981 mm) ♥ 7 ft (2,134 mm)
  - Diameter: ♠ 4 ft 2 in (1,270 mm) ♥ 4 ft 9 in (1,448 mm)
  - Tube plates: ♠ 11 ft 2 1/8 in (3,407 mm) ♥ 11 ft 2 1/8 in (3,407 mm)
  - Small tubes: ♠ 185: 1 3/4 in (44 mm) ♥ 220: 2 in (51 mm)
- Boiler pressure: ♠ 160 psi (1,103 kPa) ♥ 180 psi (1,241 kPa)
- Safety valve: Ramsbottom
- Heating surface
  - Firebox: ♠ 95 sq ft (8.8 m^{2}) ♥ 111 sq ft (10.3 m^{2})
  - Tubes: ♠ 946 sq ft (87.9 m^{2}) ♥ 1,287.5 sq ft (119.61 m^{2})
  - Total surface: ♠ 1,041 sq ft (96.7 m^{2}) ♥ 1,398.5 sq ft (129.92 m^{2})
- Cylinders: Two
- Cylinder size: 17 in (432 mm) bore 26 in (660 mm) stroke
- Valve gear: Stephenson
- Valve type: Slide
- Couplers: Johnston link-and-pin AAR knuckle (1930s)
Performance figures
- Tractive effort: ♠ 16,690 lbf (74.2 kN) @ 75% ♥ 18,780 lbf (83.5 kN) @ 75%
Career
- Operators: Cape Government Railways; OVGS; Imperial Military Railways; Central South African Railways; South African Railways; Sudan Railways
- Class: CGR & OVGS 6th Class, CSAR Class 6-L1, SAR Class 6
- Number in class: 40
- Numbers: CGR 139-160, 353-370; OVGS 60-69; CSAR 336-345; SAR 401-440
- Delivered: 1893–1894
- First run: 1893
- Withdrawn: 1973
- Disposition: Three preserved (429, 432, 439), remainder scrapped

The South African Railways Class 6 4-6-0 of 1893 was a steam locomotive from the pre-Union era in the Cape of Good Hope.

In 1893 and 1894, the Cape Government Railways placed forty 6th Class steam locomotives with a 4-6-0 wheel arrangement in service, twenty-two on its Western System and eighteen on its Midland System. Ten of them were sold to the Oranje-Vrijstaat Gouwerment-Spoorwegen in 1897. At the end of the Second Boer War in 1902, these ten became the Class 6-L1 on the Central South African Railways. In 1912, all forty locomotives were renumbered and designated Class 6 when they were assimilated into the South African Railways.

== Design ==
To meet the increasing weight of fast passenger trains on the Western and Midland Systems, the 6th Class 4-6-0 passenger steam locomotive was conceived and designed at the Salt River works of the Cape Government Railways (CGR) at the same time as the 7th Class, both according to the specifications of Michael Stephens, then Chief Locomotive Superintendent of the CGR, and under the supervision of H.M. Beatty, then Locomotive Superintendent of the Western System. Whereas the 7th Class was conceived primarily as a goods locomotive, the 6th Class was intended to be its fast passenger service counterpart.

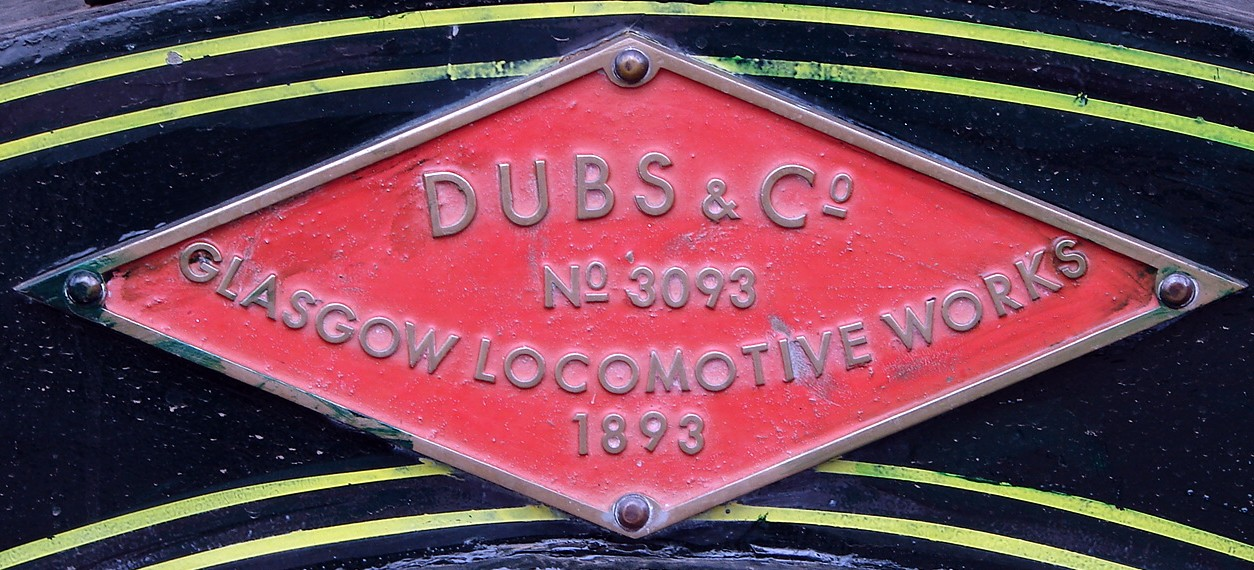
Dübs works plate

The 6th Class introduced the Type YB tender, a three-axle tender with a coal capacity of 5 long tons 10 hundredweight (5.6 tonnes) and a water capacity of 2,370 imperial gallons (10,800 litres). The engines and tenders were built by Dübs and Company and were delivered in 1893 and 1894, numbered in the ranges from 139 to 160 for the Western System and 353 to 370 for the Midland System.

== Characteristics ==
The boiler had an operating pressure of 160 pounds per square inch (1,103 kilopascals) and was equipped with Ramsbottom safety valves, while the firebox had a brick arch. The seats of the driver and stoker were mounted on poles which allowed them to be swung around to outside the cab.

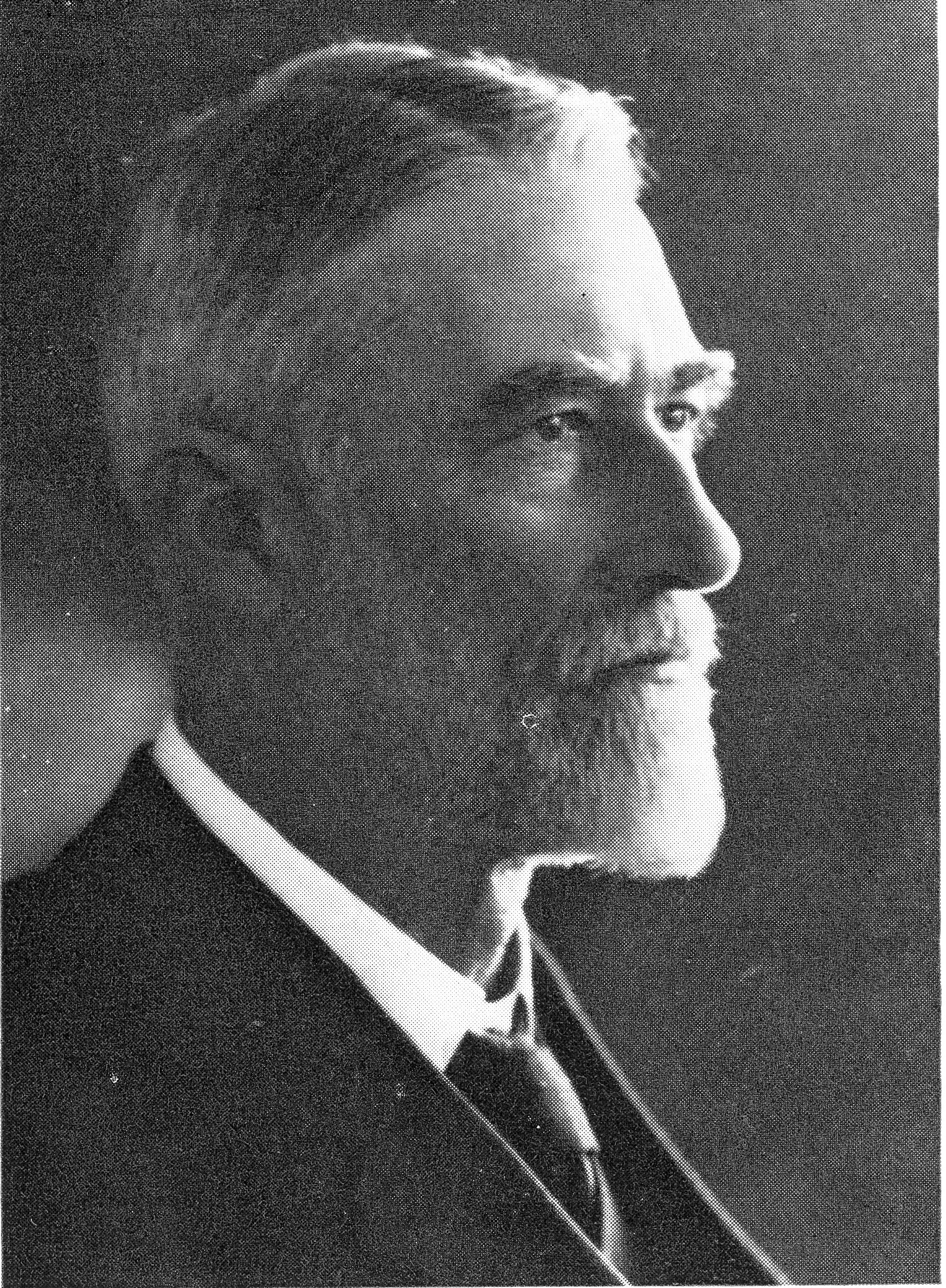
H.M. Beatty

The 6th Class was to become one of the most useful classes of locomotives to see service in South Africa. They were fast, easy to handle, good steamers and had an exceptionally low maintenance cost, with long periods between major overhauls.

They were so advanced over previous designs that C.B. Elliot, General Manager of the CGR at the time, stated in his annual report in 1894 that the increased speed of which they were capable would render practicable the running of passenger trains between Cape Town and Johannesburg in 48 hours. P.A. Hyde, Chief Locomotive Superintendent of the Central South African Railways (CSAR) from 1902 to 1904, considered the 6th Class as "about the best design for their weight ever made".

== Service ==
=== Cape Government Railways ===
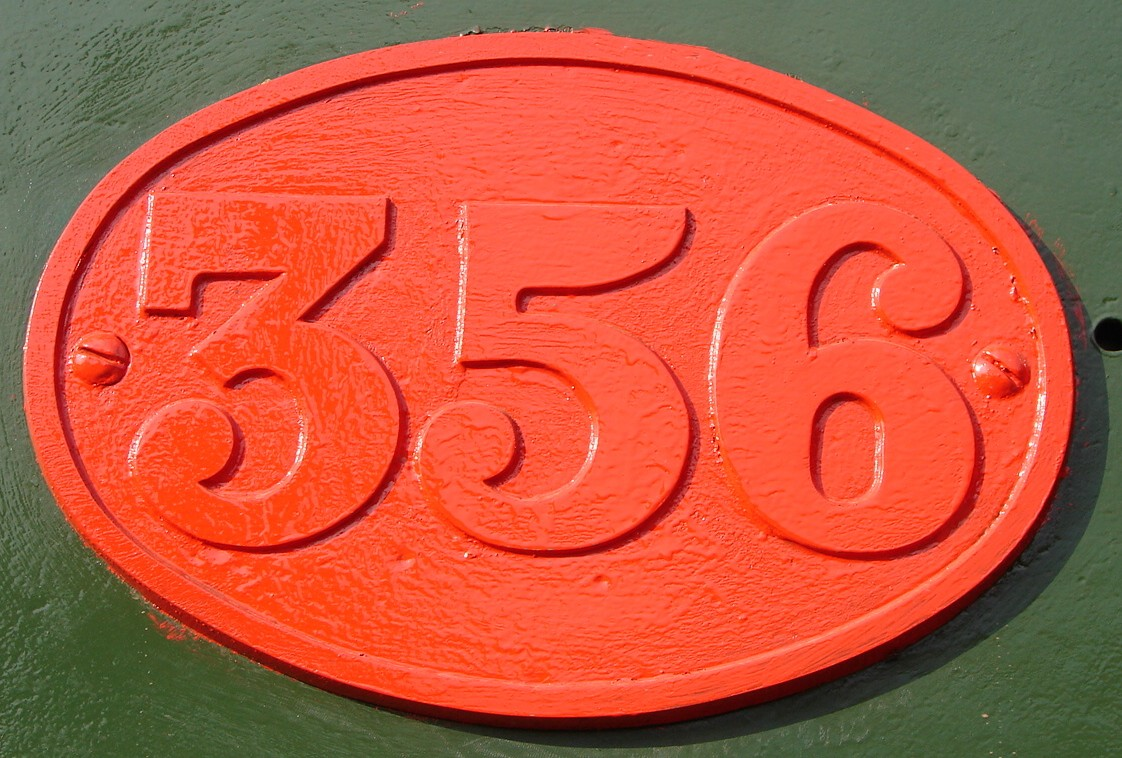
CGR number plate

The 6th Class was introduced primarily as a passenger locomotive, but when it became displaced by larger and more powerful locomotive classes, it literally became a Jack-of-all-trades which proved itself as one of the most useful and successful locomotive types to be designed at the Salt River shops. It would eventually see service in all parts of the country, except Natal, and would be used on all types of traffic.

=== Oranje-Vrijstaat Gouwerment-Spoorwegen ===
Two of the Western and eight of the Midland System's locomotives were sold to the Oranje-Vrijstaat Gouwerment-Spoorwegen (OVGS) in 1897 and renumbered in the OVGS number range from 60 to 69. The OVGS designated them 6th Class L.

=== Central South African Railways ===
When the Orange Free State was occupied by the invading British forces during the Second Boer War, these OVGS locomotives were taken over and used by the Imperial Military Railways (IMR), but not renumbered. When the IMR reverted to civilian control after the war and became established as the CSAR in 1902, these ten locomotives were designated CSAR Class 6-L1 and renumbered in the range from 336 to 345.

=== South African Railways ===
When the Union of South Africa was established on 31 May 1910, the three Colonial government railways (CGR, Natal Government Railways and CSAR) were united under a single administration to control and administer the railways, ports and harbours of the Union. Although the South African Railways and Harbours came into existence in 1910, the actual classification and renumbering of all the rolling stock of the three constituent railways was only implemented with effect from 1 January 1912.

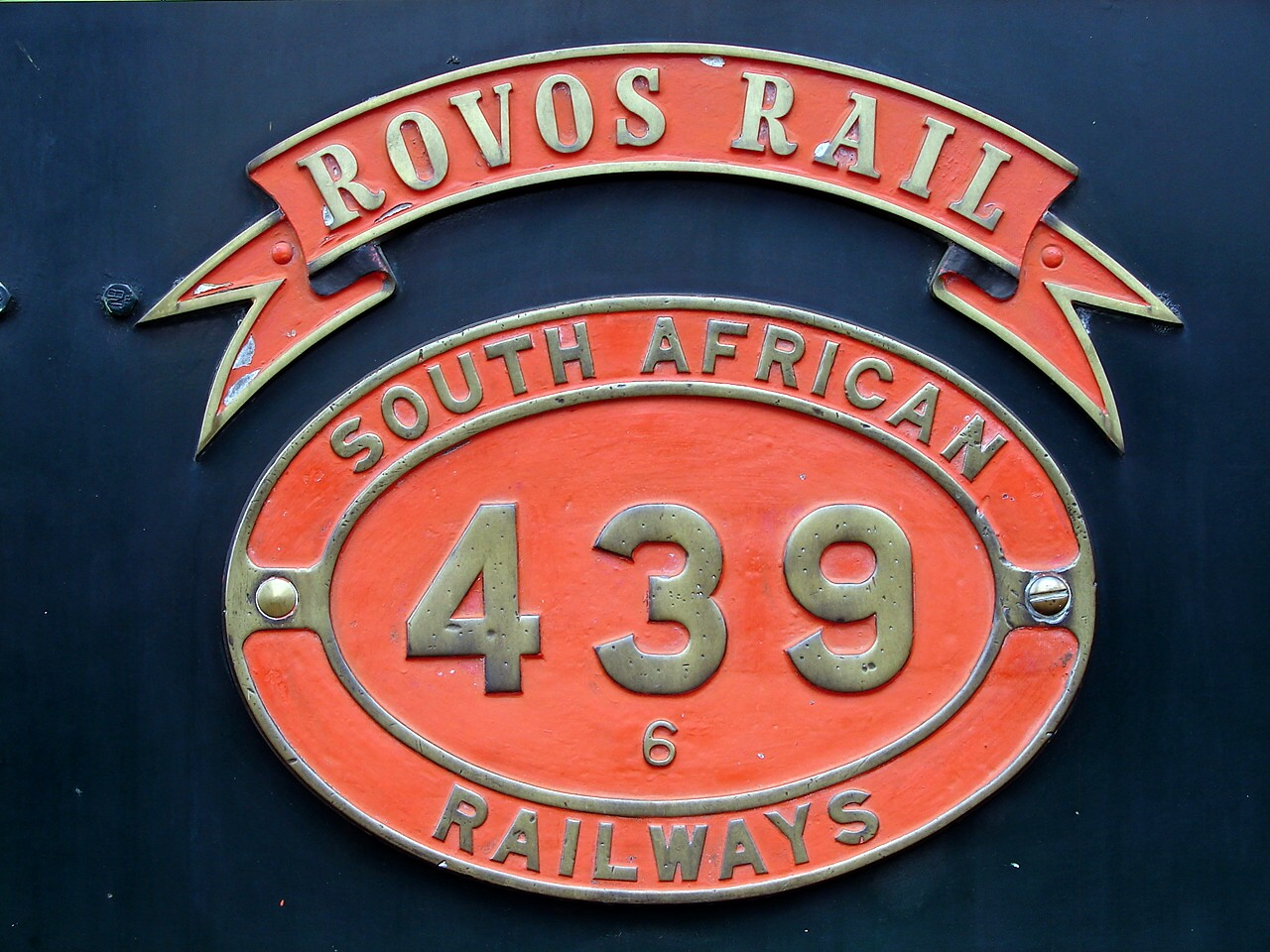

In 1912, these forty locomotives were renumbered in the range from 401 to 440 on the South African Railways (SAR) and designated Class 6. The rest of the CGR's 6th Class locomotives, together with the Class 6-L2 and 6-L3 locomotives which had been inherited by the CSAR from the OVGS via the IMR, were grouped into thirteen more sub-classes by the SAR. The 4-6-0 locomotives were designated SAR Classes 6A to 6H and 6J to 6L, the 2-6-2 locomotives were designated SAR Class 6Y and the 2-6-4 locomotives were designated Class 6Z.

In Cape Town, the Class 6 held a monopoly over the suburban service until electrification took place in 1928. On the Reef, they also worked in suburban service between Randfontein and Springs until the loads became too heavy for them. They were employed on branchlines all over the country, Natal excepted, and practically every big station and several smaller ones had its quota of these handy locomotives to work the local passenger, goods and shunting services.

=== Sudan Railways ===
During the Second World War, sixteen locomotives of the Classes 6 to 6D were transferred to the Middle East to assist with the war effort during the North African Campaign. The seven Class 6 locomotives in this group were numbers 402, 403, 406, 417, 421, 423 and 436. They were sold to the Sudan Railways Corporation in 1942 and were renumbered in the range from M700 to M706, in the same order as their former SAR engine numbers.

== Modifications ==
Several of the CSAR's Class 6L1 to 6-L3 locomotives were modified by P.A. Hyde by having their round-top fireboxes replaced with larger boilers and Belpaire fireboxes and by having larger, more sheltered cabs installed. This conversion improved their performance tremendously, to the extent that they could be used in place of the 8th Class where they were formerly outclassed by load. This represented an increase in hauling capacity of some 12% while their coal consumption was reduced by some 5%. Of the CSAR Class 6-L1 locomotives, only no. 336 underwent this modification.

As a result, several of the SAR Classes 6, 6A and 6B locomotives were similarly modified in later years, without altering their classifications. During the 1930s, many of them were modified once again, when the Chief Mechanical Engineer of the SAR at the time, A.G. Watson, embarked on his program of standardisation and reboilered them with round-topped fireboxes once again while retaining the larger cabs. These engines were not reclassified.

== Renumbering ==
By the time the last ones were eventually withdrawn from service in 1973, the Class 6 had achieved a service life of eighty years, a performance which can be matched by few other locomotive classes worldwide. During their long service lives, some of the 6th Class locomotives underwent multiple renumbering. All were initially numbered into the CGR's Western and Midland Systems rosters. Fourteen of the Midland's locomotives, in the number ranges from 353 to 355 and 360 to 370, were later renumbered in the ranges from 553 to 555 and 560 to 570. At the time when the renumbering took place, the four which were not renumbered, numbers 356 to 359, had already been sold to the OVGS.

It would appear that the Western System was more concerned with having unbroken number ranges than the CGR itself was about awarding different classifications to dissimilar locomotives, even if they were of different wheel arrangements. The numbers of the two Western System locomotives which had been sold to the OVGS, 155 and 160, were subsequently allocated again to two of the batch of fourteen locomotives which were delivered by Neilson, Reid and Company in 1902 and which were to become the Class 6J.

All forty locomotives were eventually renumbered onto the SAR's roster in 1912, designated SAR Class 6 and renumbered in the range from 401 to 440. Only one of the Class 6 locomotives underwent all these renumberings, from CGR no. 365 to CGR no. 565, then OVGS no. 65, then CSAR no. 341, then SAR no. 436 and finally Sudan Railways no. M706.

The table lists their years in service and Dübs works numbers, as well as all their renumbering.

Class 6 4-6-0 Works numbers and renumbering
Year	Dübs no.	CGR no.	CGR new no.	OVGS no.	CSAR no.	SAR no.	Sudan no.
1893	3050	139				402	M700
1893	3051	140				403	M701
1893	3052	141				404	
1893	3053	142				405	
1893	3054	143				406	M702
1893	3055	144				407	
1893	3068	145				415	
1893	3069	146				416	
1893	3070	147				417	M703
1893	3071	148				418	
1893	3072	149				419	
1893	3073	150				420	
1893	3060	151				421	M704
1894	3087	152				422	
1894	3088	153				423	M705
1894	3089	154				424	
1894	3090	155	See 6J	60	336	401	
1894	3099	156				425	
1894	3100	157				426	
1894	3101	158				427	
1894	3102	159				428	
1893	3091	160	See 6J	66	342	437	
1894	3097	353	553			429	
1894	3098	354	554			430	
1893	3056	355	555			431	
1893	3057	356		61	337	432	
1893	3058	357		62	338	433	
1893	3059	358		63	339	434	
1893	3066	359		64	340	435	
1893	3061	360	560			408	
1893	3062	361	561			409	
1893	3063	362	562			410	
1893	3064	363	563			411	
1893	3065	364	564			412	
1893	3067	365	565	65	341	436	M706
1894	3096	366	566			413	
1893	3092	367	567	67	343	438	
1893	3093	368	568	68	344	439	
1893	3094	369	569	69	345	440	
1894	3095	370	570			414	

== Preserved Locomotives ==
Three survive in South Africa.

- No. 429 is plinthed on display at Graaf Reinet.
- No. 432 was on display at the Union Carriage & Wagon Works in Nigel. Sold in 2023 by Alstom Ubunye to Mr D Bedford. Currently stored at Germiston Depot.
- No. 439 is operational with Rovos Rail on the Luxury Train Pride of Africa on occasions. Named Tiffany.

== Illustration ==
The main picture shows ex Midland System no. 368, later renumbered no. 568, then OVGS 6th Class L no. 68, then CSAR Class 6-L1 no. 344, then SAR Class 6 no. 439 and finally Rovos Rail's restored Tiffany. The following pictures illustrate the Class 6 in service and preserved, with different fireboxes, various headlight types which were in use over the years and with different types of tender.

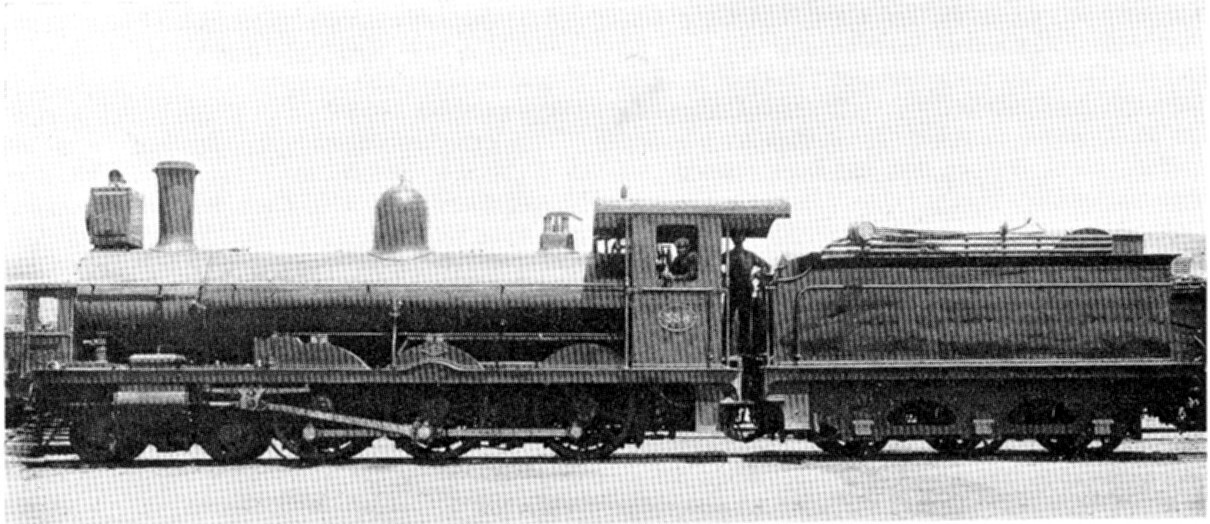
CGR no. 357, then OVGS no. 62, then CSAR no. 338, then SAR no. 433, with its as-delivered round-top firebox and Type YB three-axle tender

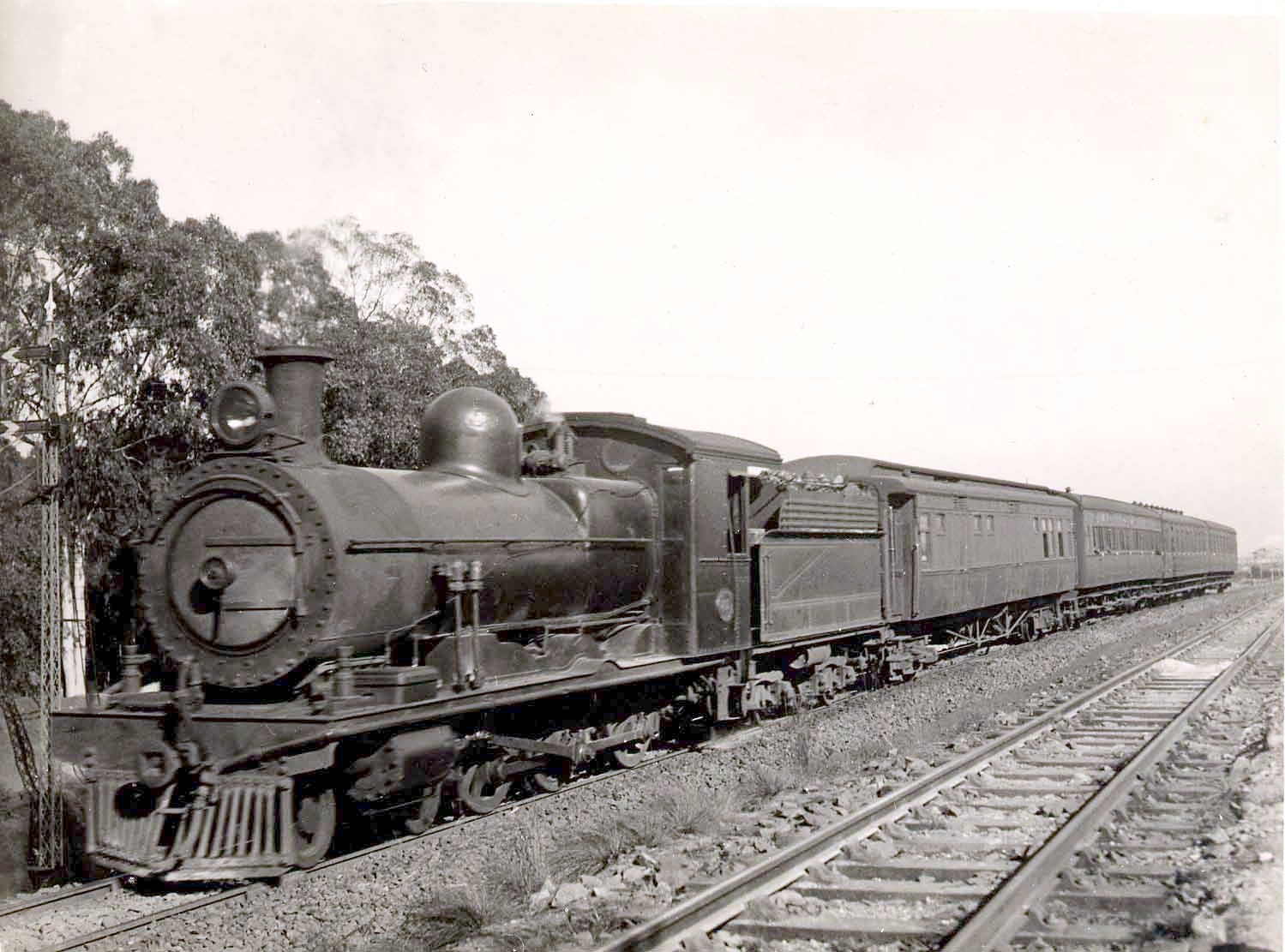
CGR no. 364, then CGR no. 564, then SAR no. 412 with a Belpaire firebox and a bogie tender

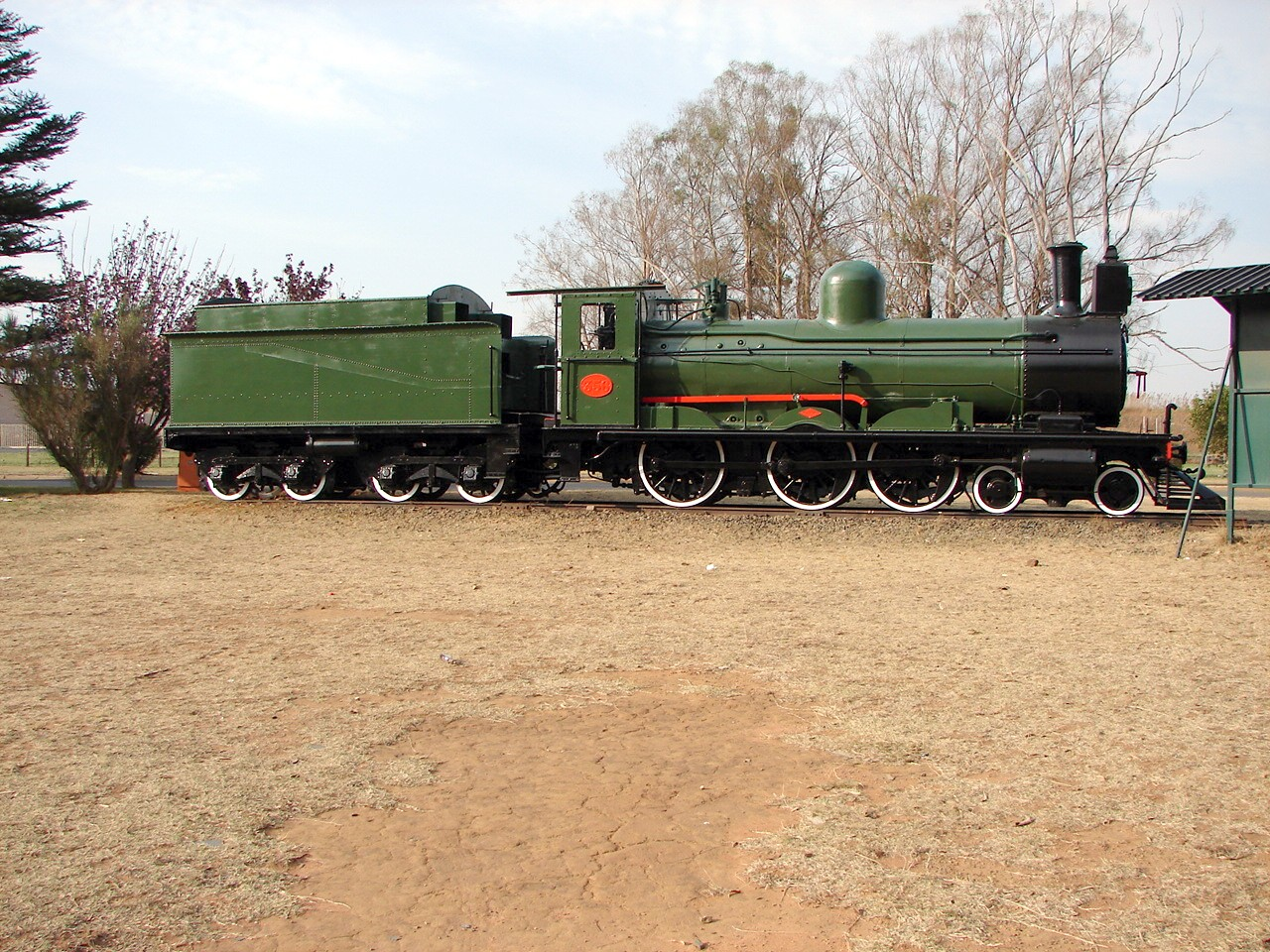
CGR no. 356, then OVGS no. 61, then CSAR no. 337, then SAR no. 432, plinthed with a Type XE1 bogie tender

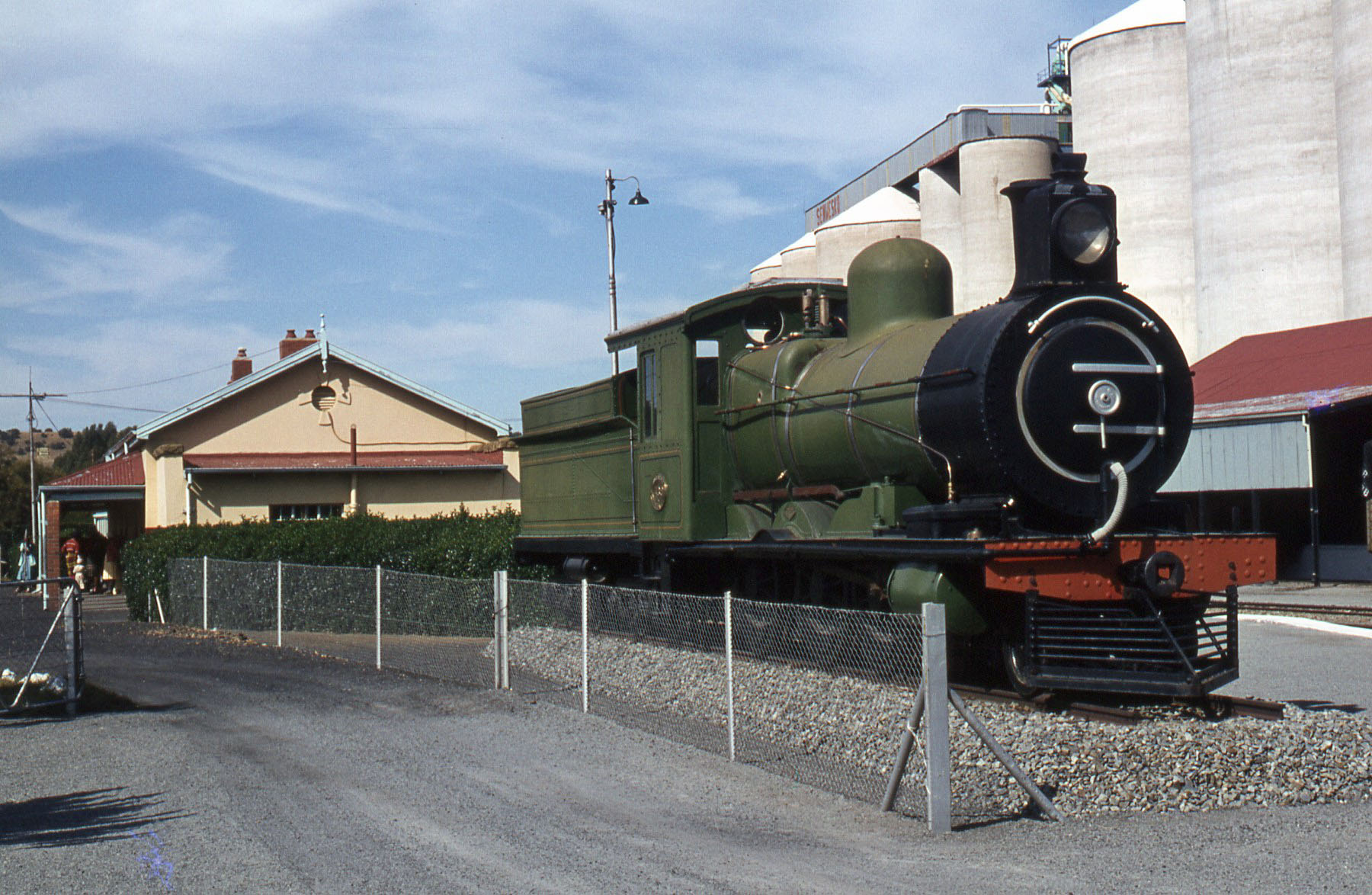
SAR Class 6 no. 439, later to become Rovos Rail's engine Tiffany, plinthed at Winburg prior to its restoration, 5 May 1981
