= South African Class 5A 4-6-2 =

1903 design of steam locomotive

CGR Karoo Class 4-6-2 1903 South African Class 5A 4-6-2
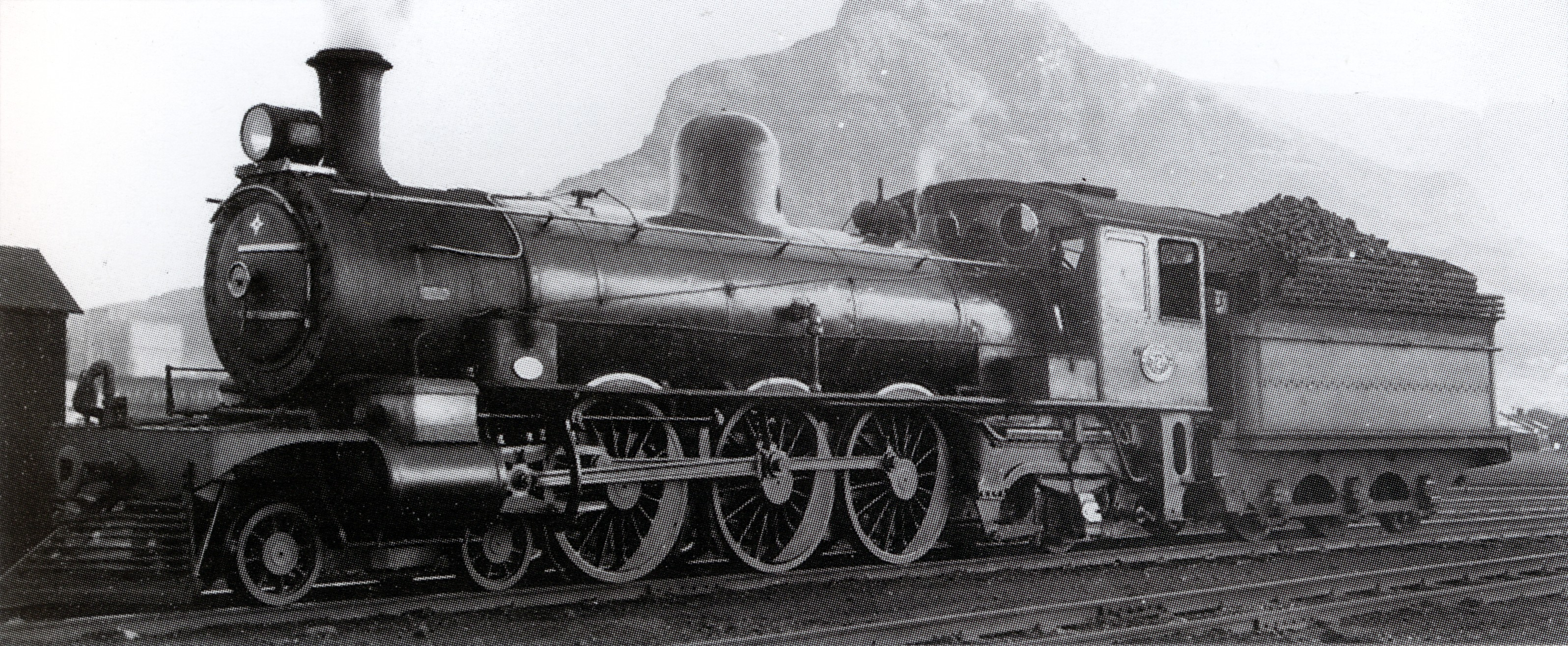
- CGR no. 903, SAR no. 721, Paardeneiland, c. 1940
Type and origin
- Power type: Steam
- Designer: Cape Government Railways (H.M. Beatty)
- Builder: Kitson and Company
- Serial number: 4193–4194
- Model: CGR Karoo
- Build date: 1903
- Total produced: 2
Specifications
- Configuration
  - Whyte: 4-6-2 (Pacific)
  - UIC: 2'C1'n2
- Driver: 2nd coupled axle
- Gauge: 3 ft 6 in (1,067 mm) Cape gauge
- Leading dia.: 28 1/2 in (724 mm)
- Coupled dia.: 60 in (1,524 mm)
- Trailing dia.: 33 in (838 mm)
- Tender wheels: 37 in (940 mm)
- Wheelbase: 49 ft 1 1/8 in (14,964 mm)
  - Axle spacing (Asymmetrical): 1-2: 5 ft 7 in (1,702 mm); 2-3: 5 ft 3 in (1,600 mm)
  - Engine: 28 ft 2 1/2 in (8,598 mm)
  - Leading: 6 ft (1,829 mm)
  - Coupled: 10 ft 10 in (3,302 mm)
  - Tender: 10 ft (3,048 mm)
- Length: 58 ft 9 in (17,907 mm)
- Height: 12 ft 10 in (3,912 mm)
- Frame type: Bar
- Axle load: 12 LT 15 cwt (12,950 kg)
  - Leading: 11 LT 7 cwt (11,530 kg)
  - 1st coupled: 12 LT 14 cwt (12,900 kg)
  - 2nd coupled: 12 LT 15 cwt (12,950 kg)
  - 3rd coupled: 12 LT 15 cwt (12,950 kg)
  - Trailing: 10 LT 12 cwt (10,770 kg)
  - Tender axle: Axle 1: 10 LT 8 cwt (10,570 kg); Axle 2: 10 LT 15 cwt (10,920 kg); Axle 3: 10 LT 17 cwt (11,020 kg)
- Adhesive weight: 38 LT 4 cwt (38,810 kg)
- Loco weight: 60 LT 3 cwt (61,120 kg)
- Tender weight: 32 LT (32,510 kg)
- Total weight: 92 LT 3 cwt (93,630 kg)
- Tender type: YE (3-axle)
- Fuel type: Coal
- Fuel capacity: 5 LT 10 cwt (5.6 t)
- Water cap.: 2,825 imp gal (12,800 L)
- Firebox
  - Type: Round-top
  - Grate area: 26 sq ft (2.4 m^{2})
- Boiler
  - Pitch: 7 ft 1/2 in (2,146 mm)
  - Diameter: 4 ft 7 3/4 in (1,416 mm)
  - Tube plates: 14 ft 6 1/4 in (4,426 mm)
  - Small tubes: 154: 2 1/4 in (57 mm)
- Boiler pressure: 180 psi (1,241 kPa)
- Safety valve: Ramsbottom
- Heating surface
  - Firebox: 110 sq ft (10 m^{2})
  - Tubes: 1,317 sq ft (122.4 m^{2})
  - Total surface: 1,427 sq ft (132.6 m^{2})
- Cylinders: Two
- Cylinder size: 18 1/2 in (470 mm) bore 26 in (660 mm) stroke
- Valve gear: Stephenson
- Valve type: Richardson balanced slide
- Couplers: Johnston link-and-pin
Performance figures
- Tractive effort: 20,030 lbf (89.1 kN) @ 75%
Career
- Operators: Cape Government Railways; South African Railways
- Class: CGR Karoo Class; SAR Class 5A
- Number in class: 2
- Numbers: CGR 903-904; SAR 721-722
- Delivered: 1903
- First run: 1903
- Withdrawn: 1940
- The centre coupled axle had flangeless wheels

The South African Railways Class 5A 4-6-2 of 1903 was a steam locomotive from the pre-Union era in the Cape of Good Hope.

In 1903, the Cape Government Railways placed two Karoo Class steam locomotives with a 4-6-2 Pacific type wheel arrangement in passenger service. In 1912, when they were assimilated into the South African Railways, they were renumbered and designated Class 5A.

== Design ==
The Karoo Class of the Cape Government Railways (CGR) was the first tender locomotive with a 4-6-2 Pacific type wheel arrangement to be introduced in Africa. It was the logical development of the CGR 6th Class 2-6-2 Prairie type which later became the Class 6Y on the South African Railways (SAR).

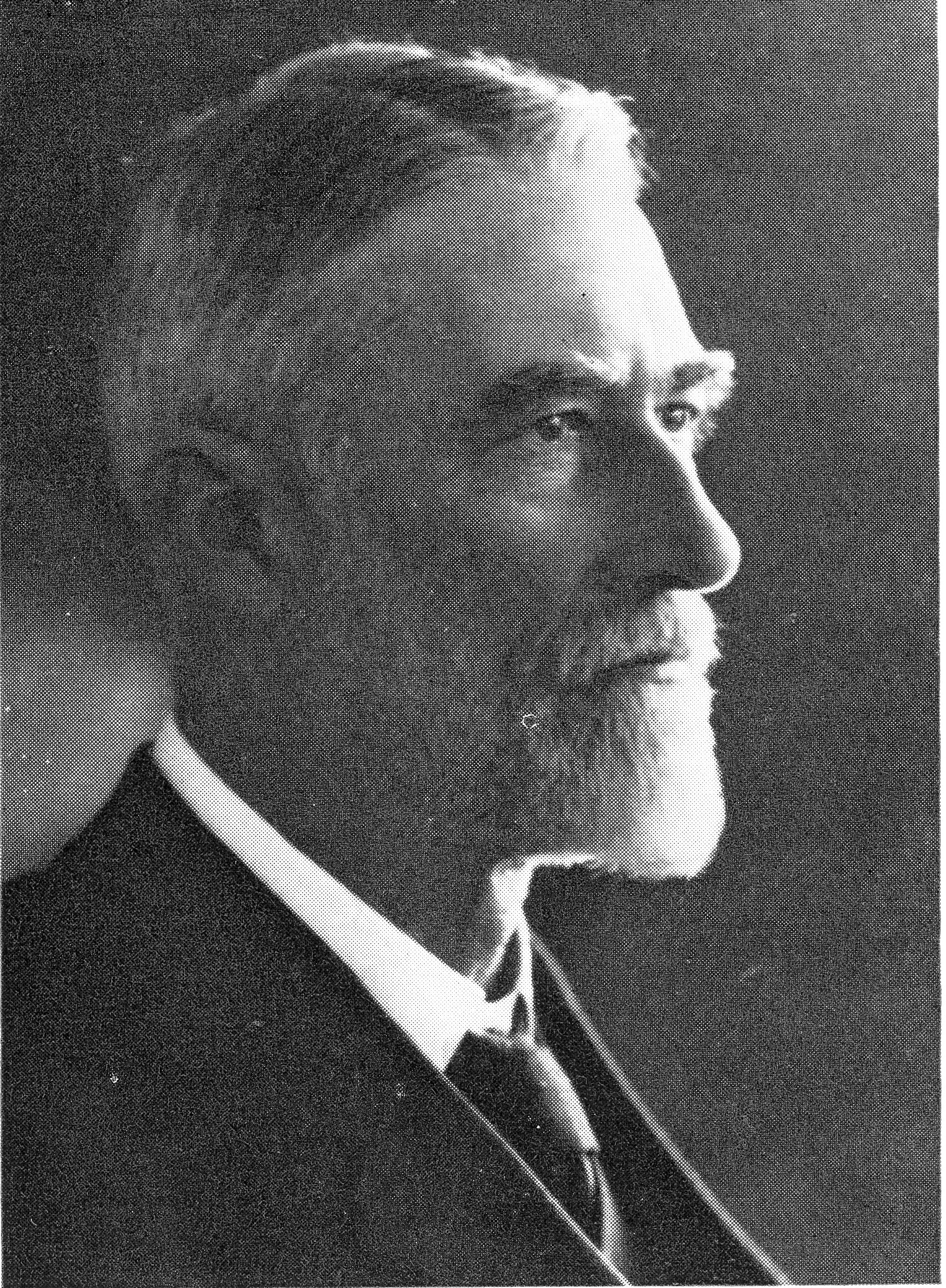
H.M. Beatty

Designed by CGR Chief Locomotive Superintendent H.M. Beatty at the Salt River shops in Cape Town, it was acquired to cope with the increasing weight of passenger trains on the one-in-eighty gradients between Beaufort West and De Aar.

The locomotive had a bar frame, Stephenson valve gear and used saturated steam. At the time, there was a general belief that any appreciable raising of the boiler pitch would result in a top-heavy locomotive. Since Beatty was very cautious about raising the boiler's centre line to more than twice the rail gauge, or 7 feet (2,134 millimetres), and in this case also to accommodate the large 60 inches (1,520 millimetres) diameter coupled wheels, he resorted to cutting the boiler shell and installing specially shaped pockets to obtain the required clearance.

== Manufacturer ==
In 1903, two of these locomotives were built by Kitson and Company, immediately after building the two 6th Class 2-6-2 Prairie locomotives since their works numbers follow in sequence. They were numbered 903 and 904, but were not allocated class numbers by the CGR and instead became known as the Karoo Class after the region of the Western System which they were designed to work in.

Kitson's later used the Karoo design as basis for a batch of Pacific type locomotives which it built for the Midland Railway of Western Australia.

== Characteristics ==
One of the most striking features of the Karoo Class was the length of its boiler, which was accentuated by the extended smokebox. The length of the smokebox was over 8 feet (2,438 millimetres) and the distance between the boiler's tube-plates was 14 feet 6 1/4 inches (4,426 millimetres).

The engine used Richardson slide valves, arranged above the cylinders and actuated by the Stephenson motion and rocker shafts. The eccentrics were fitted to the trailing coupled wheel axle, which resulted in exceptionally long valve connecting rods of 7 feet 10 1/4 inches (2,394 millimetres).

== South African Railways ==
When the Union of South Africa was established on 31 May 1910, the three Colonial government railways (CGR, Natal Government Railways and Central South African Railways) were united under a single administration to control and administer the railways, ports and harbours of the Union. Although the South African Railways and Harbours came into existence in 1910, the actual classification and renumbering of all the rolling stock of the three constituent railways were only implemented with effect from 1 January 1912.

In 1912, these two locomotives were renumbered 721 and 722 and designated Class 5A on the SAR.

== Service ==
In service, the Class 5A locomotives performed excellently. Beatty's annual report for 1905 stated that they ran 159,000 miles (256,000 kilometres) before a failure occurred, that failure being a hot box. They spent most of their working lives in the Karoo until they were displaced by larger locomotives. They were then placed in suburban service working out of Cape Town, where they remained until they were withdrawn from service c. 1940.

== Illustration ==
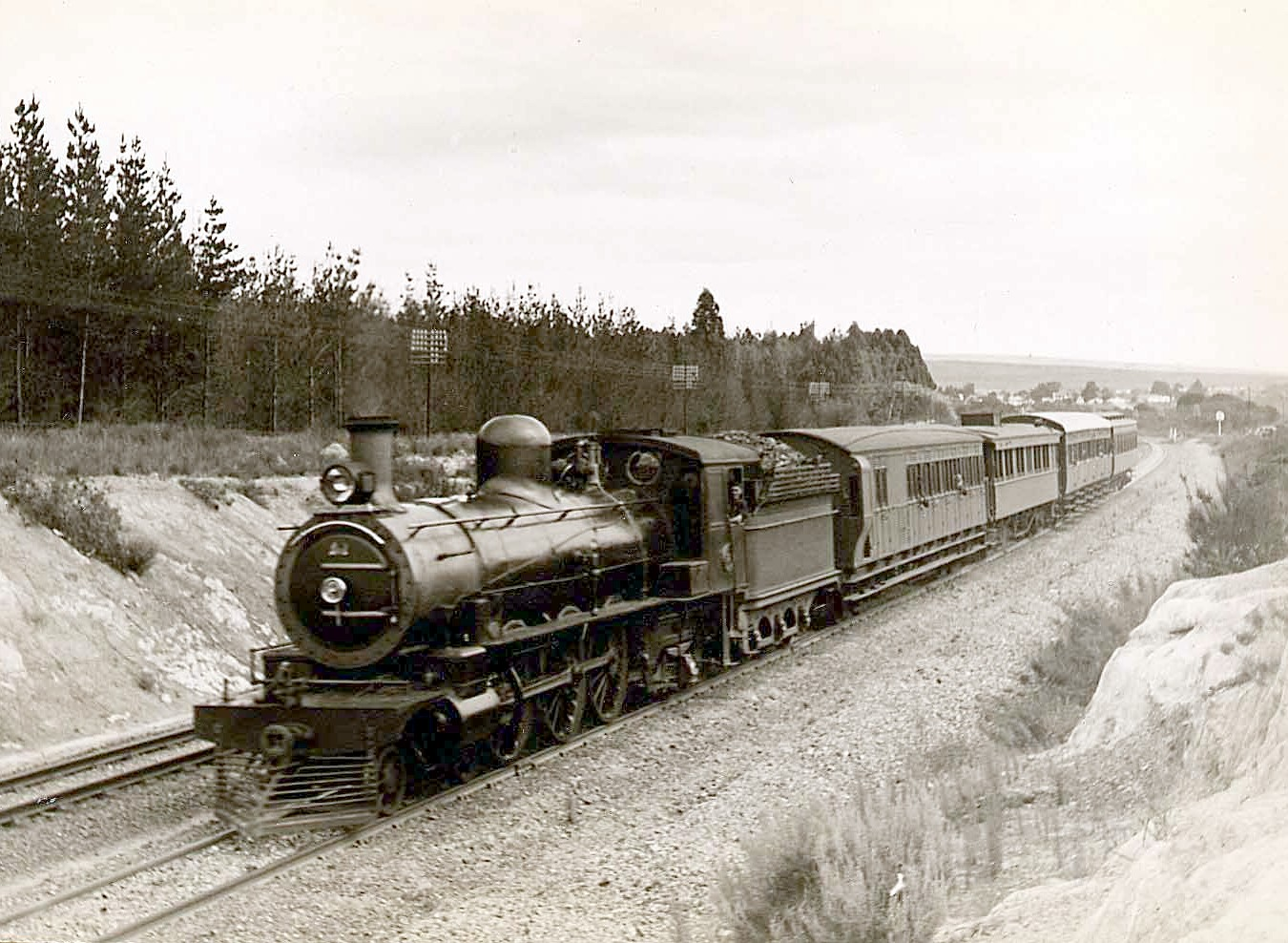
Working a suburban train, c. 1930

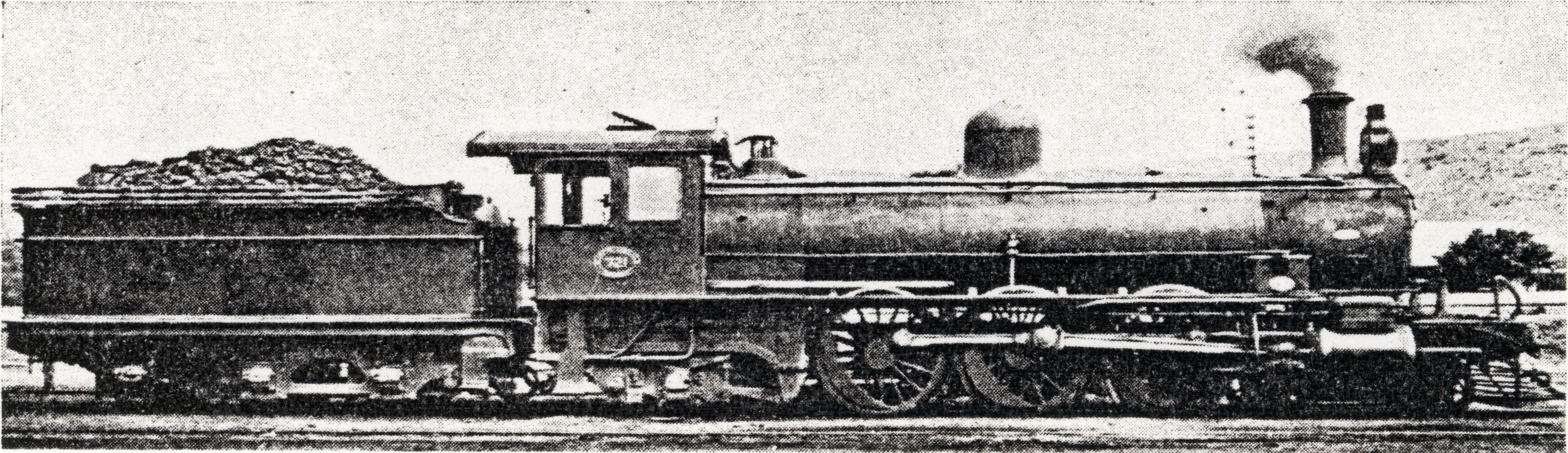
Ex CGR Karoo Class no. 903, SAR Class 5A no. 721, Paardeneiland, Cape Town, c. 1940
