= South African Class S1 0-8-0 =

1947 design of steam shunting locomotive

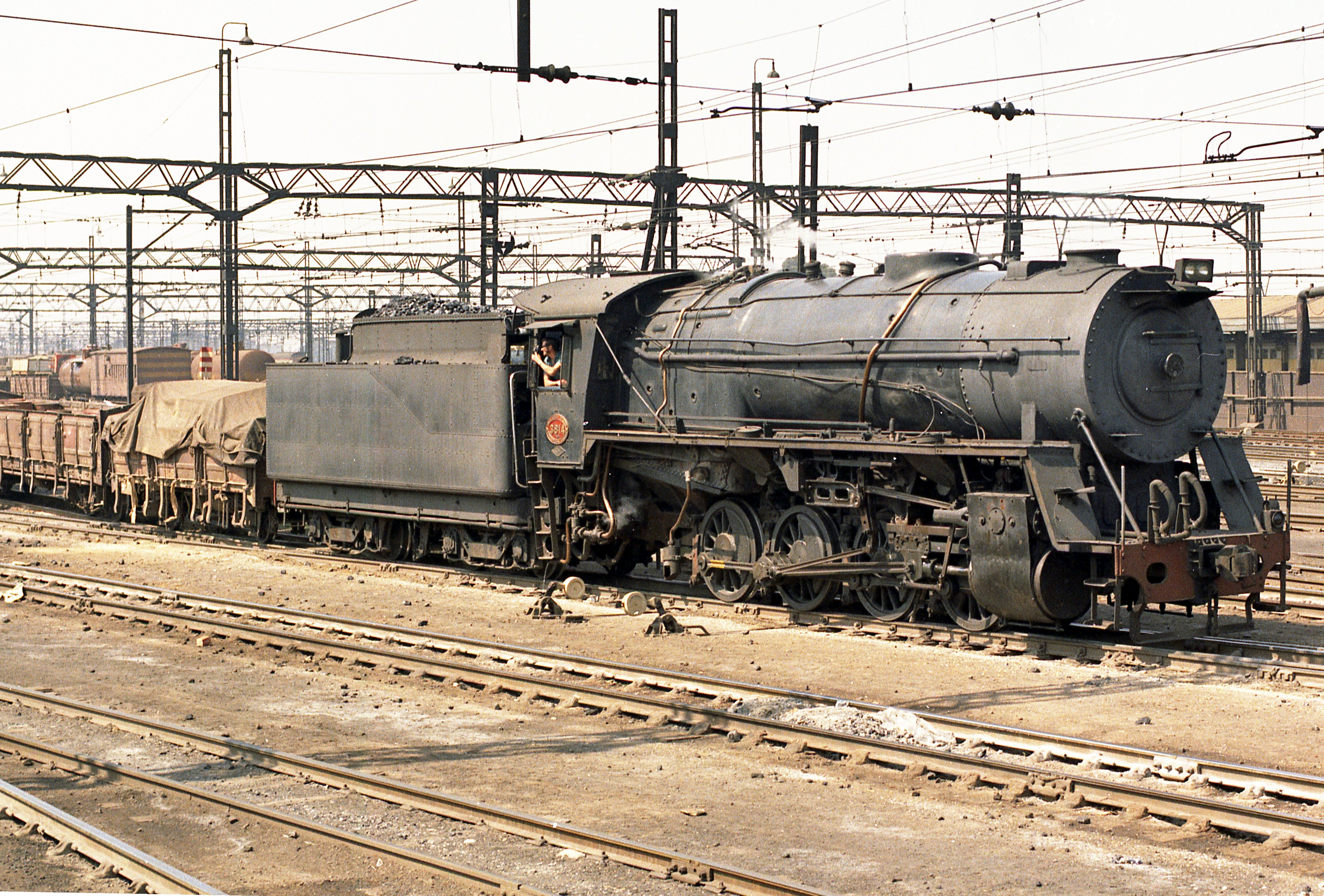
- No. 3814 in Germiston yard, August 1973
Type and origin
- Power type: Steam
- Designer: South African Railways (Dr. M.M. Loubser)
- Builder: South African Railways; North British Locomotive Company
- Serial number: NBL 27261-27285
- Model: Class S1
- Build date: 1947–1953
- Total produced: 37
Specifications
- Configuration
  - Whyte: 0-8-0 (Eight-coupled)
  - UIC: Dh2
- Driver: 3rd coupled axle
- Gauge: 3 ft 6 in (1,067 mm) Cape gauge
- Coupled dia.: 48 in (1,219 mm)
- Tender wheels: 34 in (864 mm)
- Minimum curve: 165 ft (50 m)
- Wheelbase: 49 ft 1/8 in (14,938 mm)
  - Engine: 14 ft 9 in (4,496 mm)
  - Coupled: 14 ft 9 in (4,496 mm)
  - Tender: 20 ft 5 in (6,223 mm)
  - Tender bogie: 6 ft 2 in (1,880 mm)
- Length
  - Over couplers: 64 ft 1/4 in (19,514 mm)
- Height: 12 ft 11 7/8 in (3,959 mm)
- Frame type: Bar
- Axle load: 19 LT 18 cwt (20,220 kg)
  - 1st coupled: 17 LT 18 cwt (18,190 kg)
  - 2nd coupled: 19 LT 18 cwt (20,220 kg)
  - 3rd coupled: 19 LT 7 cwt (19,660 kg)
  - 4th coupled: 17 LT 5 cwt (17,530 kg)
  - Tender bogie: Bogie 1: 31 LT 10 cwt (32,010 kg); Bogie 2: 34 LT 3 cwt (34,700 kg)
  - Tender axle: 17 LT 1 cwt 2 qtr (17,350 kg)
- Adhesive weight: 74 LT 8 cwt (75,590 kg)
- Loco weight: 74 LT 8 cwt (75,590 kg)
- Tender weight: 65 LT 13 cwt (66,700 kg)
- Total weight: 140 LT 1 cwt (142,300 kg)
- Tender type: JT1 (2-axle bogies)
- Fuel type: Coal
- Fuel capacity: 11 LT (11.2 t)
- Water cap.: 6,000 imp gal (27,300 L)
- Firebox
  - Type: Round-top
  - Grate area: 42 sq ft (3.9 m^{2})
- Boiler
  - Pitch: 9 ft 2 in (2,794 mm)
  - Diameter: 5 ft 10 1/2 in (1,791 mm)
  - Tube plates: 13 ft 2 11/16 in (4,031 mm)
  - Small tubes: 151: 2 in (51 mm)
  - Large tubes: 30: 5 1/2 in (140 mm)
- Boiler pressure: 180 psi (1,241 kPa)
- Safety valve: Pop
- Heating surface
  - Firebox: 168 sq ft (15.6 m^{2})
  - Tubes: 1,600 sq ft (150 m^{2})
  - Arch tubes: 52 sq ft (4.8 m^{2})
  - Total surface: 1,820 sq ft (169 m^{2})
- Superheater
  - Heating area: 428 sq ft (39.8 m^{2})
- Cylinders: Two
- Cylinder size: 23 1/4 in (591 mm) bore 25 in (635 mm) stroke
- Valve gear: Walschaerts
- Valve type: Piston
- Valve travel: 5 1/16 in (129 mm)
- Couplers: AAR knuckle
Performance figures
- Tractive effort: 38,000 lbf (170 kN) @ 75%
- Factor of adh.: 4•48
Career
- Operators: South African Railways
- Class: Class S1
- Number in class: 37
- Numbers: 374–385, 3801–3825
- Delivered: 1947–1954
- First run: 1947
- Withdrawn: 1980s
- The 3rd coupled axle had flangeless wheels

The South African Railways Class S1 0-8-0 of 1947 was a steam locomotive.

In 1947, the South African Railways placed twelve Class S1 shunting steam locomotives with an 0-8-0 eight-coupled wheel arrangement in service, built in the Salt River workshops in Cape Town. A further 25, built in Scotland, were placed in service in 1954.

The Class S1 was the fifth locomotive type to be designed and built in South Africa, after the Natal Government Railways 4-6-2TT Havelock of 1888, the Class 2C of 1910, the Class 20 of 1935 and the Class ES of 1936.

== Manufacturers ==
A huge increase in traffic before and during the Second World War years led to the available dedicated shunting locomotives of the South African Railways (SAR) being very much over-taxed, to the extent that they had to be supplemented by mainline locomotives. By 1943, the options were to either relegate Class 14 and other mainline engines to shunting duties or to augment the number of existing Class S shunting locomotives. The requirement for a shunting locomotive type more powerful than the Class S was identified, but since the war was still in progress, it was not viable to obtain locomotives from the usual overseas suppliers.

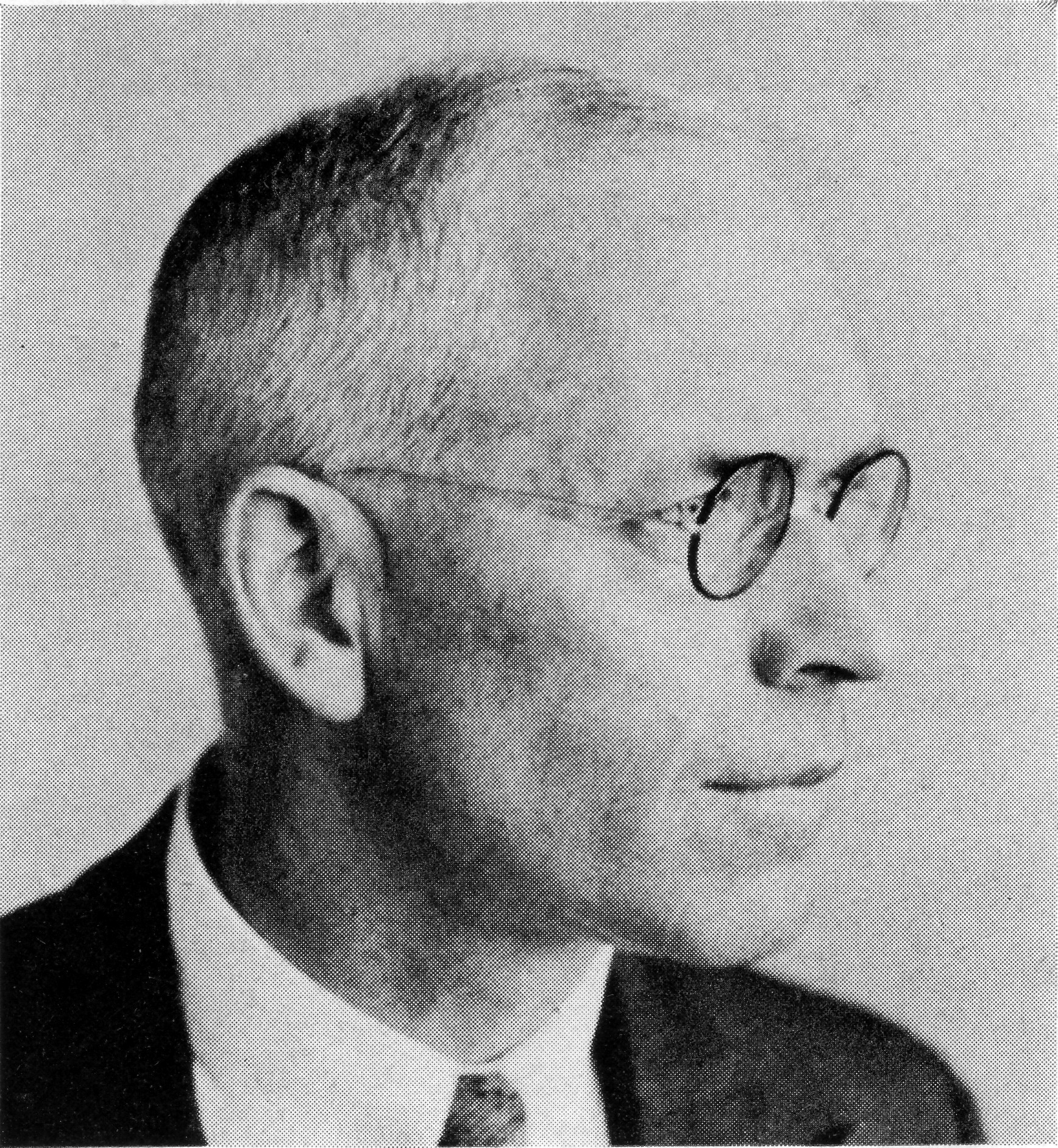
Dr. M.M. Loubser

Dr. M.M. Loubser, Chief Mechanical Engineer (CME) of the SAR from 1939 to 1949, therefore prepared designs for a larger version of the Class S locomotive which could be built in the SAR's own workshops. The result was the Class S1 0-8-0 shunting locomotive, of which the first of twelve was delivered from the Salt River shops in Cape Town in October 1947.

Twelve locomotives were built, numbered in the range from 374 to 385. The first locomotive to be released from the Salt River shops in 1947 was no. 375, which was formally handed over to the Operating Department by the senior member of the Railway Board, Mr F.T. Bates. In honour of the occasion and in view of the approaching inauguration of the Voortrekker Monument in 1949, it was named Voortrekker.

A further 25 Class S1 locomotives were subsequently ordered from the North British Locomotive Company (NBL) in Glasgow. They were built in 1953 and delivered in 1953 and 1954, numbered in the range from 3801 to 3825.

== Local production ==
Even though it was not wholly a South African product with its imported main bar frames, tyres, superheater elements and some proprietary fittings, the Class S1 was the fifth recorded instance of locomotives designed and constructed in South African workshops after the Natal Government Railways' engine Havelock of 1888, the Class 2C of 1910, the Class 20 of 1935 and the Class ES of 1936. The Class S1 was, however, the first steam locomotive to be home-built in quantity.

== Characteristics ==
At the time, the Class S1 was the world's most powerful shunting locomotive on Cape gauge and equivalent track, and all the latest developments were incorporated in its design. Since shunting locomotives are designed to operate at slow speeds in tightly curved shunting yards, there was no need for the leading or trailing wheels which are necessary to improve high speed stability on mainline locomotives. Their absence also simplified design and reduced repair costs. In addition, it is desirable to have as large a proportion of the engine weight as possible carried on the coupled wheels to obtain the maximum adhesion.

The locomotives had 4-inch thick (102-millimetre) bar frames, Walschaerts valve gear to actuate their 9 inches (229 millimetres) diameter piston valves, and were superheated. While their cylinders, driving wheel diameter, frame and many other features were similar to that of the earlier Class S shunting locomotives, their boilers were much larger, being a shortened version of Loubser's specially designed boiler which was used on the Class 12AR. The main difference from the Class 12AR boiler was in their barrel lengths. Each barrel consisted of three courses for the Class 12AR and two courses for the Class S1, the hind courses being identical. In addition, the Class 12AR had a deeper firebox. These Class S1 boilers could also be fitted to the original Class S engines, but no such reboilerings are known to have taken place.

The Class S1 boiler was provided with SAR standard boiler fittings, such as a multi-valve steam regulator fitted in the smokebox, a duplex top-feed valve for the delivery of feedwater from the injectors, a soot blower and external exhaust pipe to the smokebox, and a steam turret for the distribution of steam to the various steam-operated mechanisms. The valves for the latter were mounted on the steam turret and were fitted with spindles which extended into the cab from where they were operated by means of handwheels.

The locomotive was built with a Watson cab with a slanted front to allow easy access to the firebox cladding which covered the flexible firebox stays and stay caps. The cab was 9 feet 9 inches (2,972 millimetres) wide and was fitted with hinged adjustable glass windscreens for the lookout and a rigid extended footplate instead of the older fall plate. The cab footsteps were attached to the rigid platform.

The engine was tended by a new Type JT1 tender, built with an underframe and bogies identical to those of the Type JT tender. As on the Type GT tender of the Class S, the top sides of the Type JT1 tender's coal bunker were set inwards to afford the crew the maximum rearward field of vision. The front of the engine and the back of the tender were fitted with modified and strengthened draft gear. The intermediate drawgear between engine and tender was similar in design to that of the Class 15F. The engine and tender were both fitted with vacuum brakes.

== Service ==
The Class S1 was noted for its efficient and economical working. They were the SAR's largest and finest shunting locomotives with an enormous shifting and accelerating ability and could cope with block loads of up to 2,000 long tons (2,032 tonnes).

They were initially placed in service in the yards in Cape Town, but they ended up being used mainly in marshalling yards on the Western Transvaal System and also on the Cape Northern System, employed at Braamfontein, Millsite in Krugersdorp, Bloemfontein and Kimberley. Bloemfontein had one of the SAR's more important marshalling yards where goods trains from the north were sorted into consists bound for East London, Port Elizabeth, Mossel Bay, Cape Town and a host of Cape country towns. In its heyday, Bloemfontein's retarder yard had 40 tracks, 24 for southbound traffic and 16 for northbound. There were two humps with two primary and five secondary retarders, the latter split into three for southbound and two for northbound traffic. The hump leads were served around the clock by Class S1 engines no. 374 and 375.

By the 1970s they were distributed between Beaconsfield, Bloemfontein, Germiston, Kaserne, Springs and Witbank. By 1982 they were all stationed at Germiston and its sub-depot at Kaserne, after which they began to be withdrawn from service. The withdrawal was probably expedited by the closure of the Koedoespoort works in Pretoria to steam repairs, since it was impractical to let them do long-distance running to the next nearest steam locomotive works at Bloemfontein. None of them were sold into industrial service.

== Works numbers ==
The builders, works numbers, years built and SAR locomotive numbers of the Class S1 are listed in the table.

SAR Class S1 0-8-0
| Builder | Works no. | Year | SAR no. |
|---|---|---|---|
| SAR | | 1947 | 374 |
| SAR | | 1947 | 375 |
| SAR | | 1947 | 376 |
| SAR | | 1947 | 377 |
| SAR | | 1947 | 378 |
| SAR | | 1947 | 379 |
| SAR | | 1947 | 380 |
| SAR | | 1947 | 381 |
| SAR | | 1947 | 382 |
| SAR | | 1947 | 383 |
| SAR | | 1947 | 384 |
| SAR | | 1947 | 385 |
| NBL | 27261 | 1953 | 3801 |
| NBL | 27262 | 1953 | 3802 |
| NBL | 27263 | 1953 | 3803 |
| NBL | 27264 | 1953 | 3804 |
| NBL | 27265 | 1953 | 3805 |
| NBL | 27266 | 1953 | 3806 |
| NBL | 27267 | 1953 | 3807 |
| NBL | 27268 | 1953 | 3808 |
| NBL | 27269 | 1953 | 3809 |
| NBL | 27270 | 1953 | 3810 |
| NBL | 27271 | 1953 | 3811 |
| NBL | 27272 | 1953 | 3812 |
| NBL | 27273 | 1953 | 3813 |
| NBL | 27274 | 1953 | 3814 |
| NBL | 27275 | 1953 | 3815 |
| NBL | 27276 | 1953 | 3816 |
| NBL | 27277 | 1953 | 3817 |
| NBL | 27278 | 1953 | 3818 |
| NBL | 27279 | 1953 | 3819 |
| NBL | 27280 | 1953 | 3820 |
| NBL | 27281 | 1953 | 3821 |
| NBL | 27282 | 1953 | 3822 |
| NBL | 27283 | 1953 | 3823 |
| NBL | 27284 | 1953 | 3824 |
| NBL | 27285 | 1953 | 3825 |

== Preservation ==
Only one example is preserved.

| Number | Works nmr | THF / Private | Leaselend / Owner | Current Location | Outside SOUTH AFRICA | ? |
|---|---|---|---|---|---|---|
| 375 | | THF | Transnet Heritage Foundation | Bloemfontein Locomotive Depot | | |

== Illustration ==
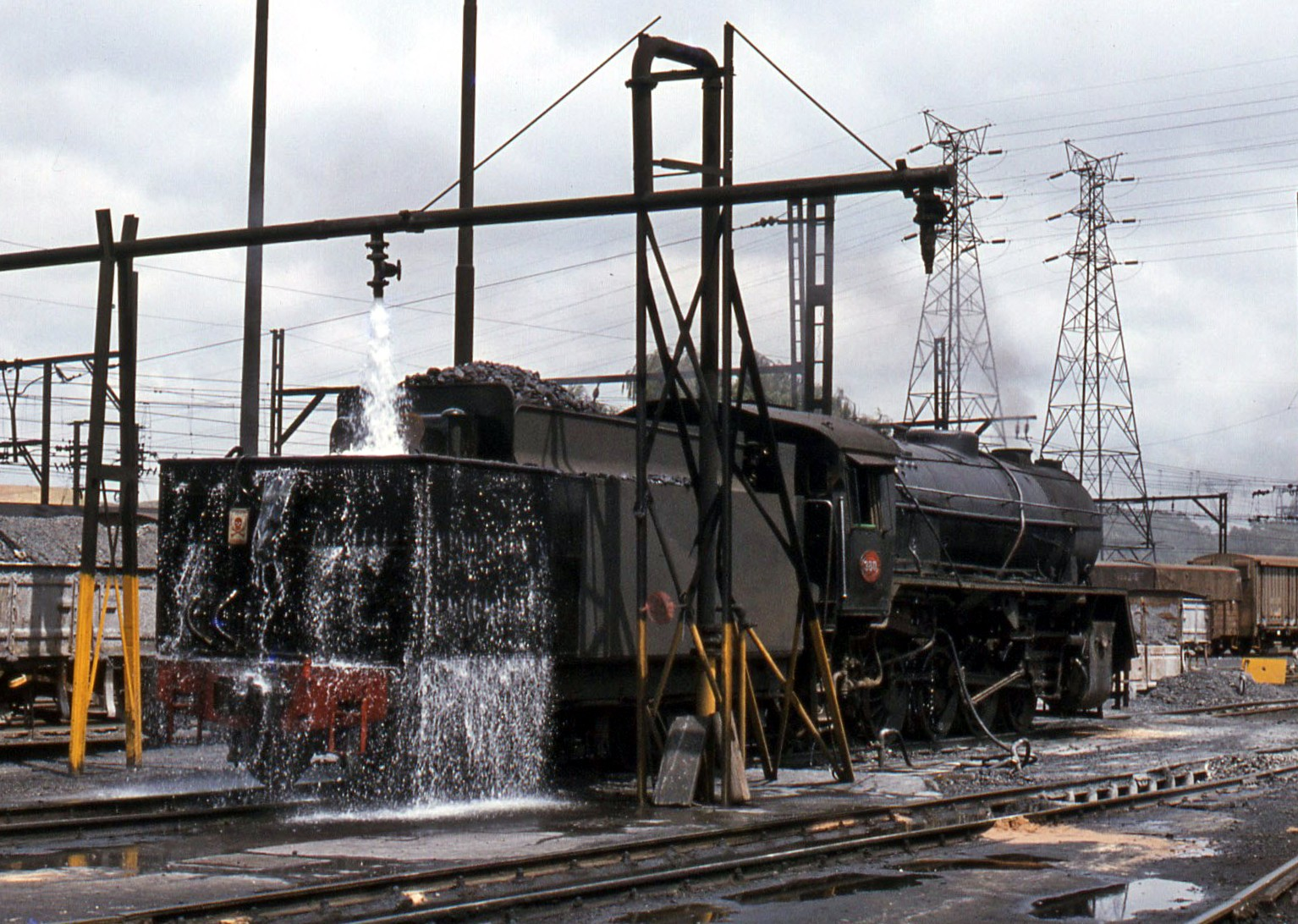
SAR-built no. 380 with enough water at Kaserne, 19 March 1983

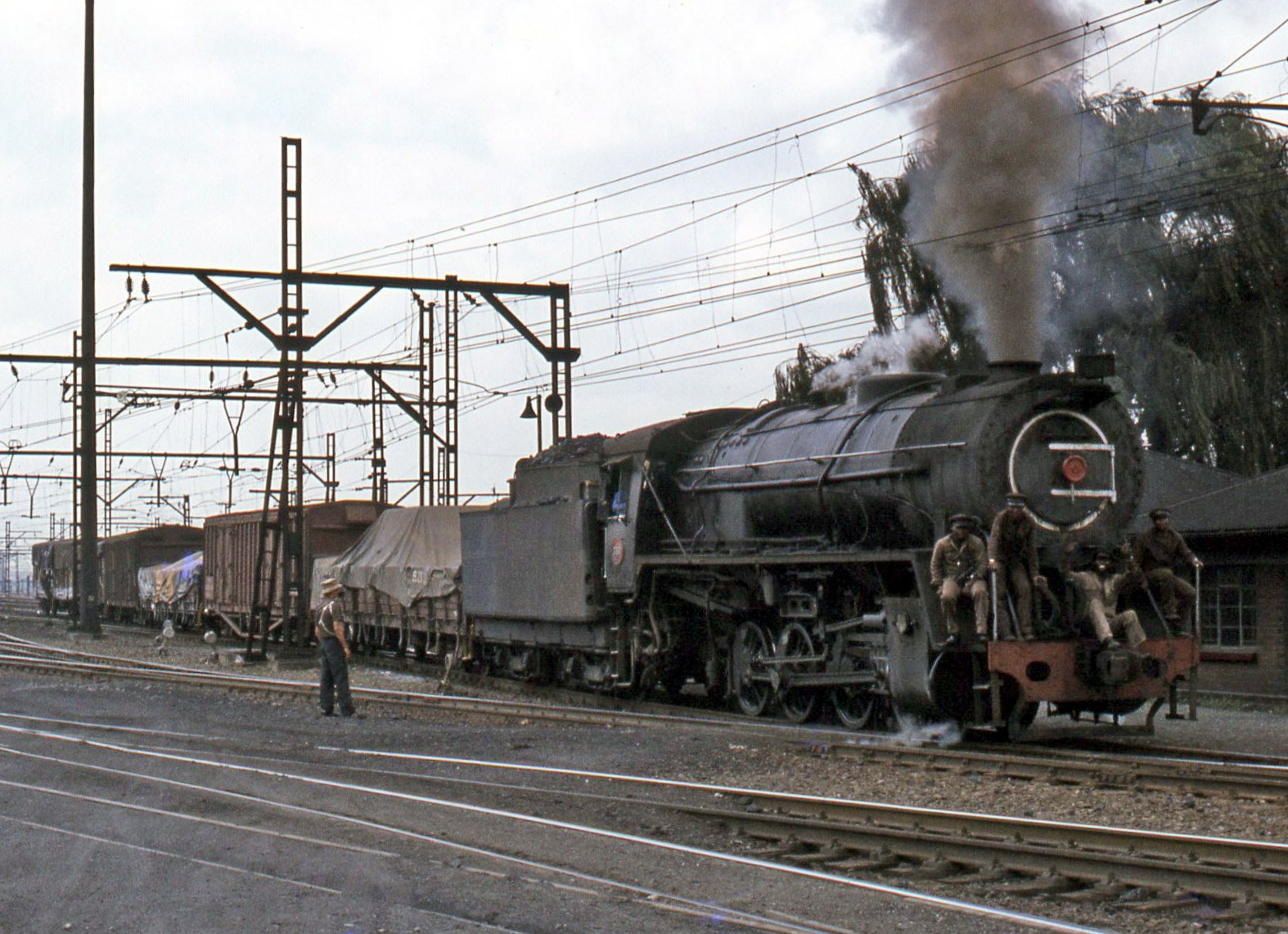
No. 380 with shunting crew aboard, Kaserne, 19 March 1983

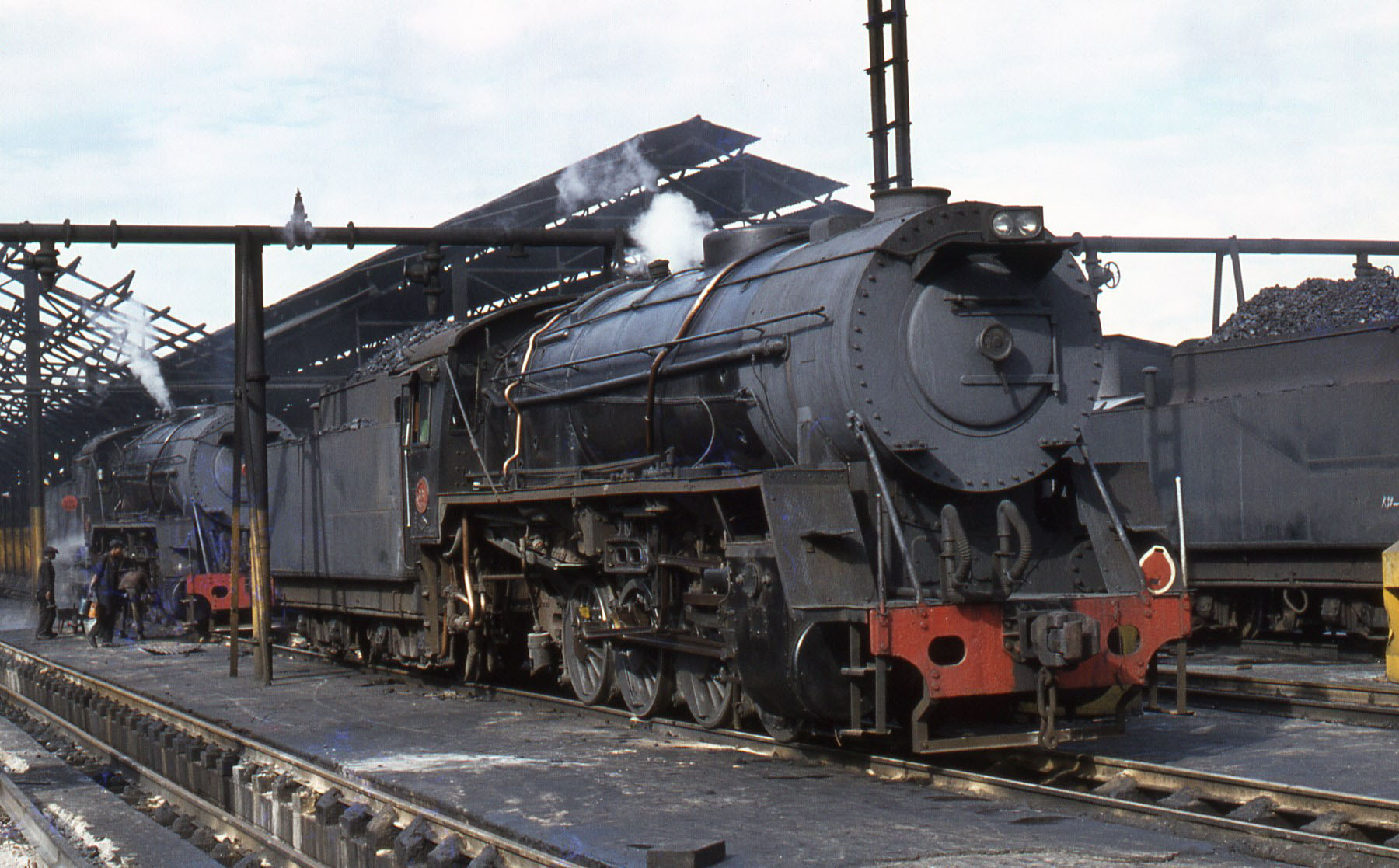
SAR-built no. 381 at Germiston Loco, 23 April 1979

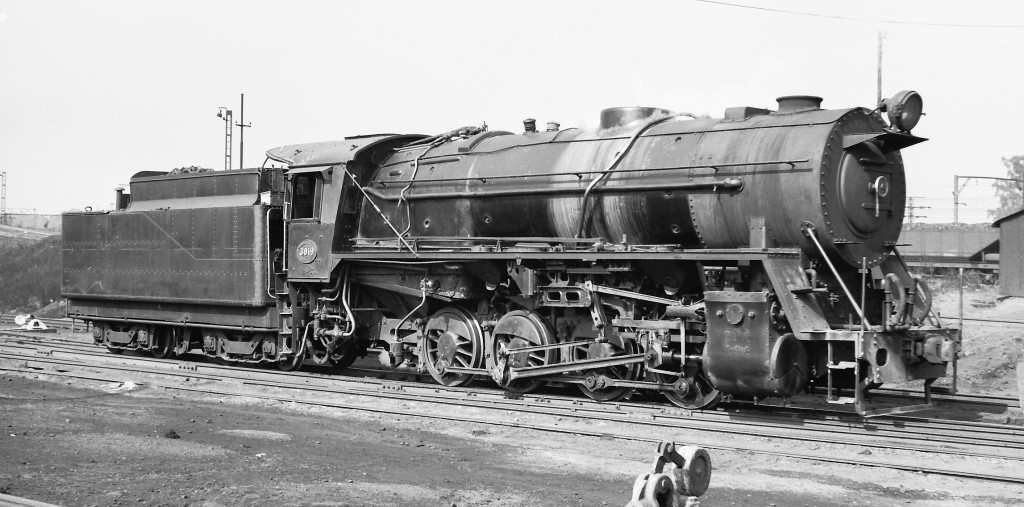
NBL-built no. 3819 at Germiston Loco, 26 June 1963
