= South African type JT1 tender =

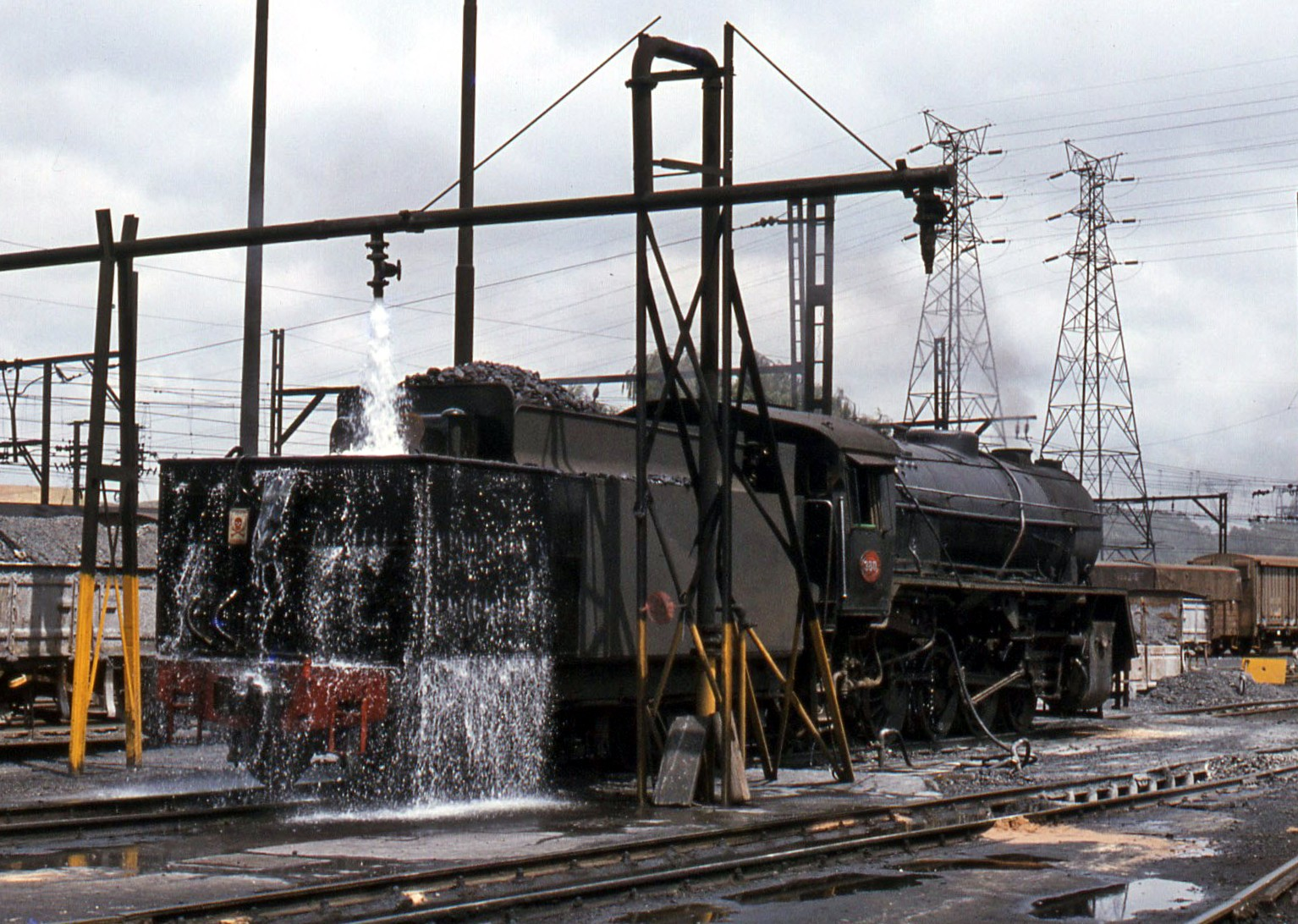
- Type JT1 tender on Class S1, 19 March 1983
Type and origin
- Locomotive: Class S1
- Designer: South African Railways (Dr. M.M. Loubser)
- Builder: South African Railways; North British Locomotive Company
- In service: 1947-1953
Specifications
- Configuration: 2-axle bogies
- Gauge: 3 ft 6 in (1,067 mm) Cape gauge
- Wheel dia.: 34 in (864 mm)
- Wheelbase: 20 ft 5 in (6,223 mm)
  - Bogie: 6 ft 2 in (1,880 mm)
- Axle load: 17 LT 1 cwt 2 qtr (17,350 kg)
  - Front bogie: 31 LT 10 cwt (32,010 kg)
  - Rear bogie: 34 LT 5 cwt (34,800 kg)
- Weight empty: 62,416 lb (28,311 kg)
- Weight w/o: 65 LT 13 cwt (66,700 kg)
- Fuel type: Coal
- Fuel cap.: 11 LT (11.2 t)
- Water cap.: 6,000 imp gal (27,300 L)
- Stoking: Manual
- Couplers: Drawbar & AAR knuckle
Career
- Operators: South African Railways
- Numbers: 374-385, 3801-3825

The South African type JT1 tender was a steam locomotive tender.

Type JT1 tenders first entered service in 1947, as tenders to the Class S1 0-8-0 eight-coupled shunting locomotives which were built and placed in service by the South African Railways in that year. In 1953 and 1954, 25 more entered service, built in Scotland.

== Manufacturers ==
Type JT1 tenders were built between 1947 and 1953 by the South African Railways (SAR) and North British Locomotive Company (NBL).

In 1947 and 1948, the SAR built and placed twelve Class S1 eight-coupled shunting steam locomotives in service. The engines and tenders were built by the Salt River shops in Cape Town to the design of Dr. M.M. Loubser, Chief Mechanical Engineer (CME) of the SAR from 1939 to 1949, and were initially placed in service in the yards in Cape Town. A further 25 Class S1 locomotives were subsequently ordered from NBL in Glasgow, built in 1953 and delivered in 1953 and 1954. The Type JT1 entered service as tenders to these locomotives.

== Characteristics ==
The tender was arranged for manual stoking and had a coal capacity of 11 long tons (11.2 tonnes) and a water capacity of 6,000 imperial gallons (27,300 litres). As on the Type GT tender of the Class S shunting locomotive, the top sides of its coal bunker were set inwards to improve the crew's rearward vision. The front of the engine and the back of the tender were fitted with modified and strengthened draft gear and both were fitted with vacuum brakes. It was built with an underframe and bogies identical to those of the Type JT tender.

== Locomotive ==
Only the Class S1 locomotives were delivered new with Type JT1 tenders, which were numbered in the ranges from 374 to 385 and 3801 to 3825 for their engines. An oval number plate, bearing the engine number and tender type, was attached to the rear end of the tender.

== Classification letters ==
Since many tender types are interchangeable between different locomotive classes and types, a tender classification system was adopted by the SAR. The first letter of the tender type indicates the classes of engines to which it can be coupled. The "J_" tenders could be used with the locomotive classes as shown.

- Class 15E.
- Class 15F, if arranged for manual stoking.
- Class 16E.
- Class S1.

The second letter indicates the tender's water capacity. The "_T" tenders had a capacity of between 5,587 and 6,000 imperial gallons (25,400 and 27,300 litres; 6,710 and 7,210 US gallons).

A number, when added after the letter code, indicates differences between similar tender types, such as function, wheelbase or coal bunker capacity.

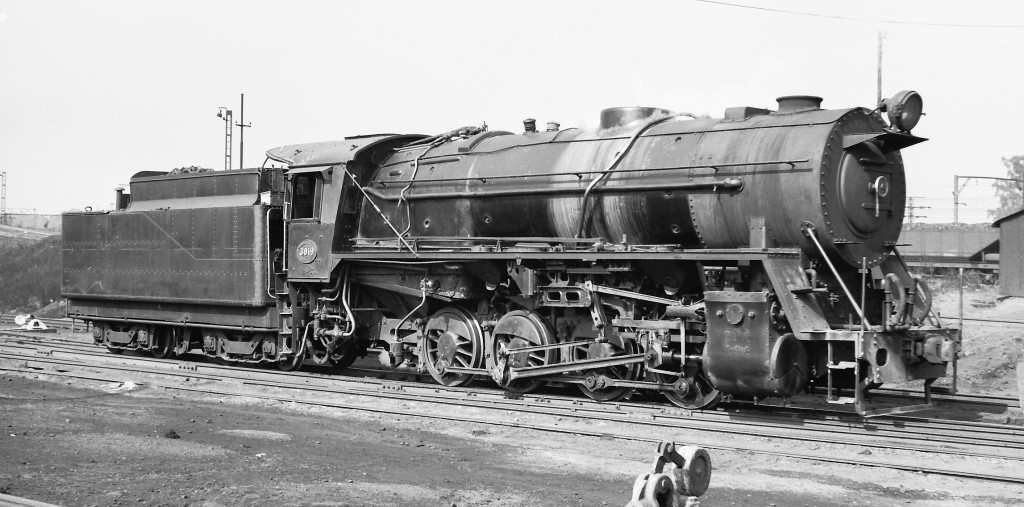
Type JT1 tender on Class S1, 26 June 1963
