= NGR 4-6-2TT Havelock =

Type of steam locomotive

NGR 2-8-2TT Havelock NGR 4-6-2TT Havelock
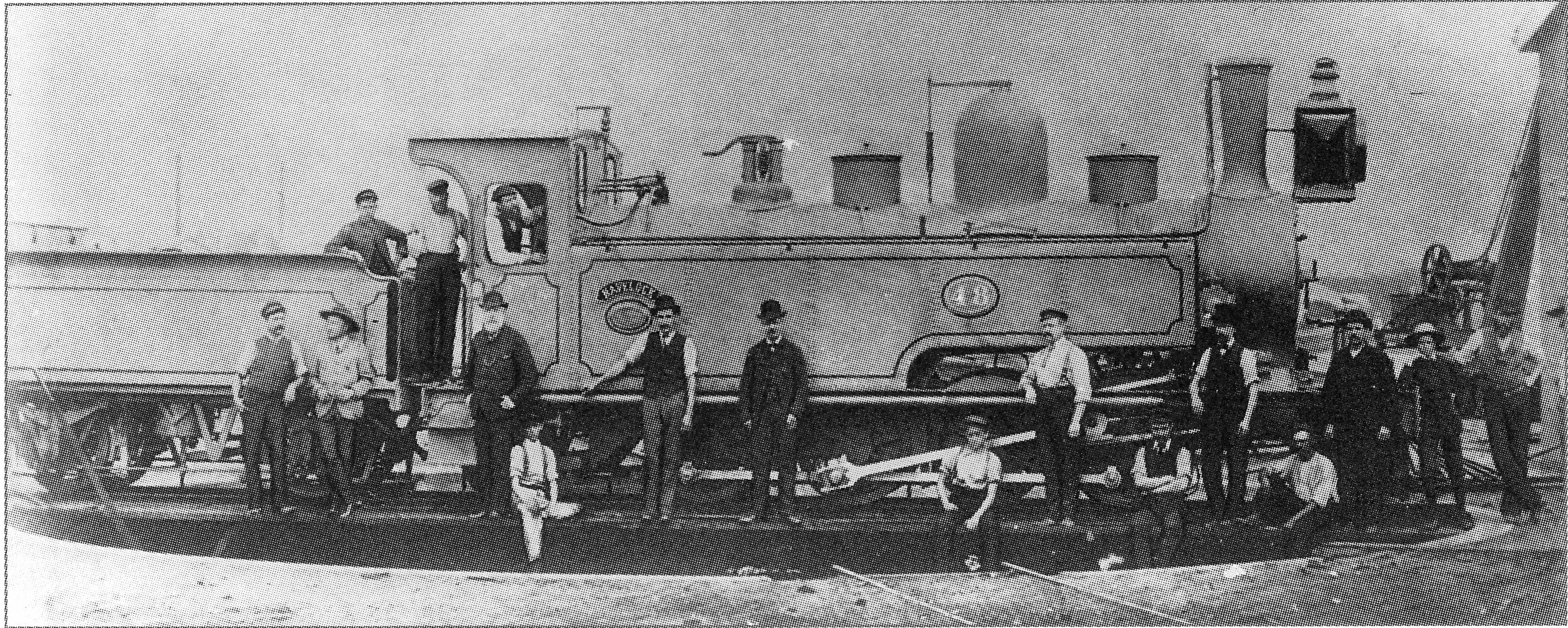
- Havelock as a Mikado type, as built, circa 1888
Type and origin
- ♠ – 2-8-2TT (Mikado) – ♥ – 4-6-2TT (Pacific)
- Power type: Steam
- Designer: Natal Government Railways (William Milne)
- Builder: Natal Government Railways
- Model: NGR 2-8-2TT
- Build date: 1888
- Total produced: 1
- Rebuilder: Natal Government Railways
- Number rebuilt: 1
Specifications
- Configuration
  - Whyte: 2-8-2TT as built (Mikado); 4-6-2TT modified (Pacific)
  - UIC: 1'D1'n2t as built 2'C1'n2t modified
- Driver: ♠ 3rd coupled axle ♥ 2nd coupled axle
- Gauge: 3 ft 6 in (1,067 mm) Cape gauge
- Leading dia.: 25 1/2 in (648 mm)
- Coupled dia.: 39 in (991 mm)
- Trailing dia.: 25 1/2 in (648 mm)
- Tender wheels: 25 1/2 in (648 mm)
- Wheelbase: ♠ 34 ft 11 1/2 in (10,655 mm)
  - Axle spacing (Asymmetrical): ♠ 1-2: 3 ft 8 in (1,118 mm); 2-3: 3 ft 8 in (1,118 mm); 3-4: 4 ft 1 1/2 in (1,257 mm) ♥ 1-2: 3 ft 8 in (1,118 mm); 2-3: 4 ft 1 1/2 in (1,257 mm)
  - Engine: ♠ 22 ft 11 1/2 in (6,998 mm)
  - Coupled: ♠ 11 ft 5 1/2 in (3,492 mm) ♥ 7 ft 9 1/2 in (2,375 mm)
  - Tender: ♠♥ 7 ft 6 in (2,286 mm)
- Length
  - Over couplers: 41 ft 1 in (12,522 mm)
- Height: 12 ft (3,658 mm)
- Frame type: Plate
- Loco weight: ♠ 38 LT (38,610 kg)
- Tender weight: ♠ 12 LT (12,190 kg)
- Total weight: ♠ 50 LT (50,800 kg)
- Tender type: 2-axle
- Fuel type: Coal
- Fuel capacity: 3 LT 10 cwt (3.6 t)
- Water cap.: 880 imp gal (4,000 L)
- Tender cap.: 900 imp gal (4,090 L)
- Firebox
  - Type: Round-top
  - Grate area: 14 sq ft (1.3 m^{2})
- Boiler
  - Pitch: 6 ft (1,829 mm)
  - Diameter: 3 ft 10 1/8 in (1,172 mm) outside
  - Tube plates: 11 ft (3,353 mm)
  - Small tubes: 174: 1 5/8 in (41 mm)
- Boiler pressure: 140 psi (965 kPa)
- Safety valve: Salter & Ramsbottom
- Heating surface
  - Firebox: 77 sq ft (7.2 m^{2})
  - Tubes: 877 sq ft (81.5 m^{2})
  - Total surface: 954 sq ft (88.6 m^{2})
- Cylinders: Two
- Cylinder size: 16 in (406 mm) bore 21 in (533 mm) stroke
- Valve gear: Stephenson
- Valve type: Slide
- Loco brake: Vacuum
- Couplers: Johnston link-and-pin
Performance figures
- Tractive effort: ♠ 14,473 lbf (64.38 kN) @ 75%
Career
- Operators: Natal Government Railways
- Number in class: 1
- Numbers: 48
- Official name: Havelock
- Nicknames: Hairy Mary
- Delivered: 1888
- First run: 1888
- Withdrawn: 1905
- ♠ The 2nd coupled axle had flangeless wheels

The Natal Government Railways 4-6-2TT Havelock of 1888 was a South African steam locomotive from the pre-Union era in the Natal Colony.

During 1887, designs for a 2-8-2 Mikado type tank-and-tender locomotive were prepared by the Natal Government Railways. The locomotive was built in the Durban workshops and entered service in 1888, named Havelock. It was later rebuilt to a 4-6-2 Pacific type wheel arrangement. The engine Havelock was the first locomotive to be designed and built in South Africa.

== Design and construction ==
The designs for a 2-8-2 Mikado type tank-and-tender locomotive were drawn up in 1887 by William Milne, the Locomotive Superintendent of the Natal Government Railways (NGR). It was built in the Durban workshops of the NGR at a cost of £3,021 and was not only the first locomotive and tender to be designed and built in South Africa, but also the first in South Africa to have eight-coupled wheels. Only the wheels and axles were obtained from England.

Construction began on 26 January 1888 and the locomotive went on its first trial trip during August of that year. It was allocated number 48 and was named Havelock, after Sir Arthur Havelock, the governor of the Colony of Natal from 1886 to 1889.

The engine Havelock was amongst the forerunners of eight-coupled locomotives in the world. It was not until eight years later, in 1896, that the first eight-coupled locomotive entered service in the United Kingdom. On the NGR, the design of the Dübs A 4-8-2T locomotive, later the NGR Class D 4-8-2T, was based on the experience gained with the engine Havelock. Their respective designs were similar in several aspects.

== Characteristics ==
The engine Havelock was the first tender locomotive in NGR service, a tank-and-tender engine which carried water in the four-wheeled tender as well as in the side-tanks. The engine and tender were both equipped with vacuum brakes. The locomotive had two boiler-mounted sandboxes and was equipped with both Salter and Ramsbottom safety valves. The firebox was equipped with a rectangular flat-bottomed type of ashpan, which was only 10 inches (254 millimetres) deep since it had to clear the trailing axle.

The leading and trailing carrying wheels were fitted in F.W. Webb-type radial axleboxes. Webb's arrangement consisted of two radial axle boxes joined by a curved casting, so that they moved in unison between curved steel plates bolted to the main frame. A bogie check spring, having a single spiral spring, was enclosed in a box secured to the curved plates. The arcs of the leading and trailing radial axle boxes were struck from a centre midway between the coupled wheels.

== Service ==
The first official trip was made from Durban to Pinetown on 7 January 1889, after which the engine Havelock was placed in service on the Durban-Cato Ridge section. Being the pride and joy of the NGR, the engine Havelock was present at several official functions, such as the opening of the line from Ladysmith to Biggarsberg Junction on 12 September 1889 and the turning of the first sod for the Orange Free State branchline at Ladysmith on 7 November 1889.

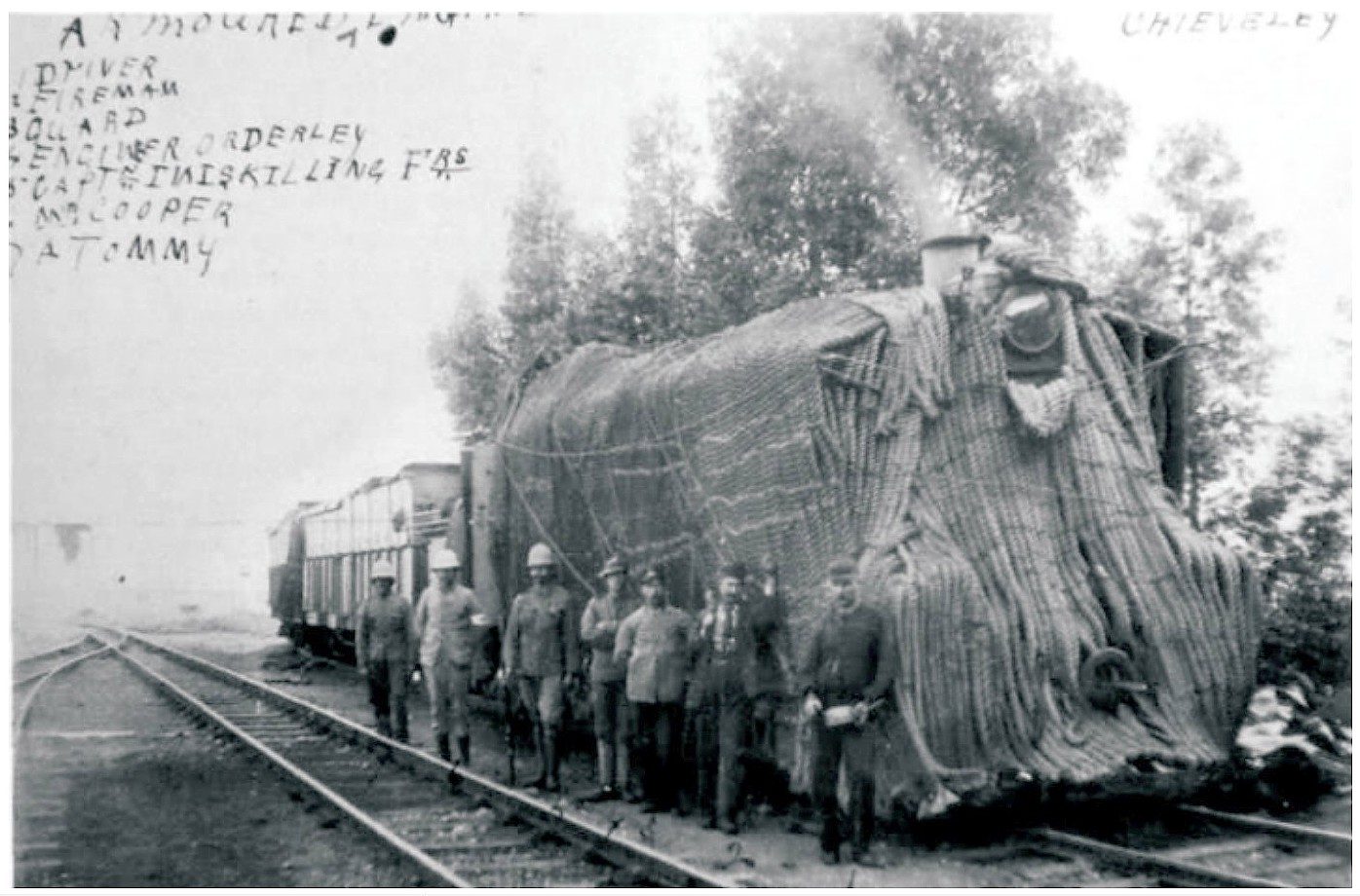
Havelock as Hairy Mary at Chievely, Natal, c. 1898

During the Second Boer War, the engine Havelock was prepared to see action while serving on armoured trains. Unlike usual practice in such cases, the engine was not equipped with armour plate protection, but was draped in strands of thick hemp rope which covered it from front to back. This earned the locomotive the apt nickname Hairy Mary amongst the troops.

== Modification ==
After the introduction of the more powerful Dübs A 4-8-2T locomotives, the engine Havelock was relegated to branchline working. It was converted to a 4-6-2 Pacific type wheel arrangement for this work, since the shorter coupled wheelbase would enable it to negotiate sharper curves. The engine remained in service on the North Coast line between Durban and Verulam until it was scrapped in 1905.

== Illustration ==
The main picture shows the engine Havelock in its original Mikado type configuration, while the pictures below shows it in its subsequent Pacific type configuration.

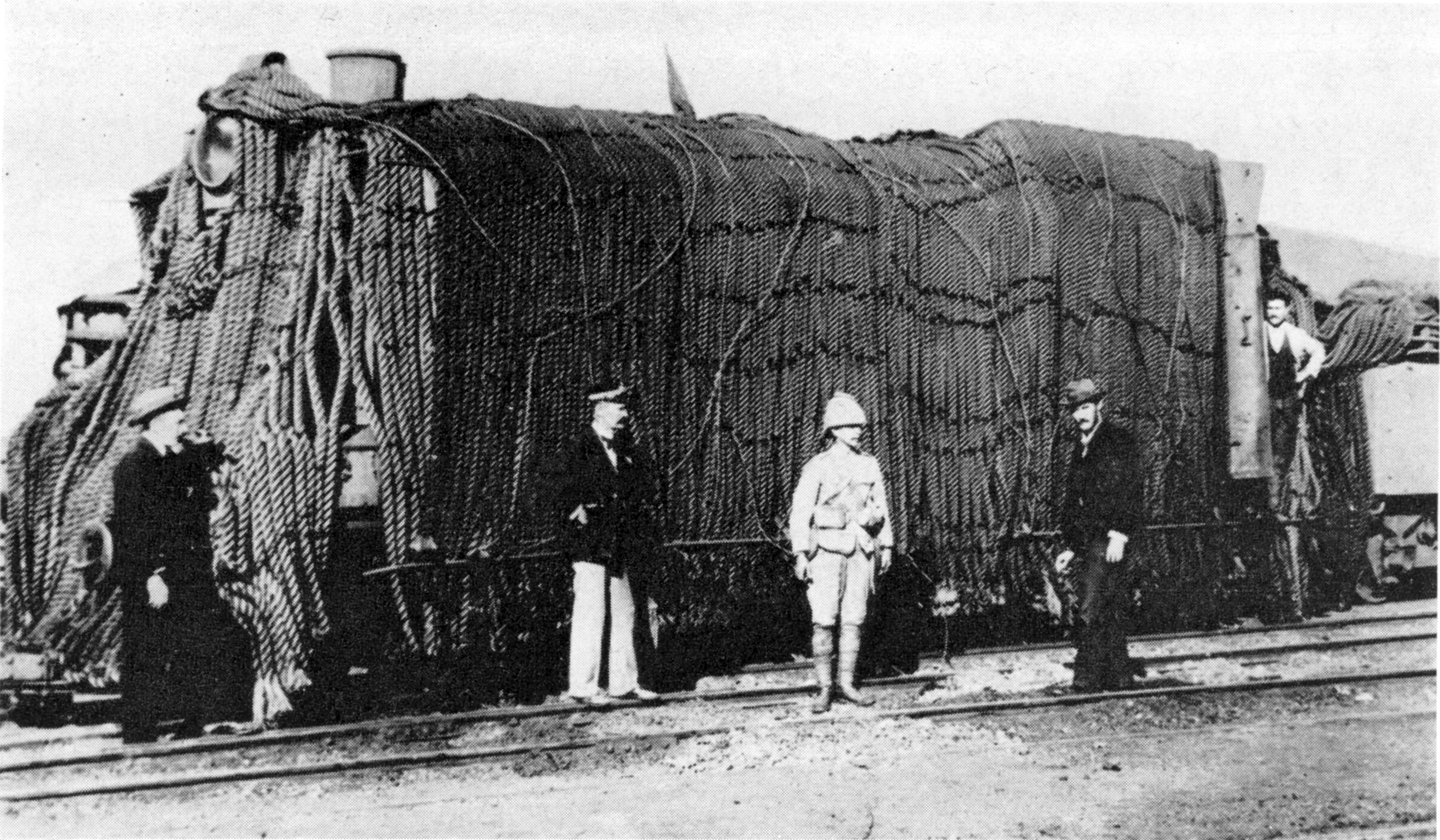
Havelock as Hairy Mary, c. 1898

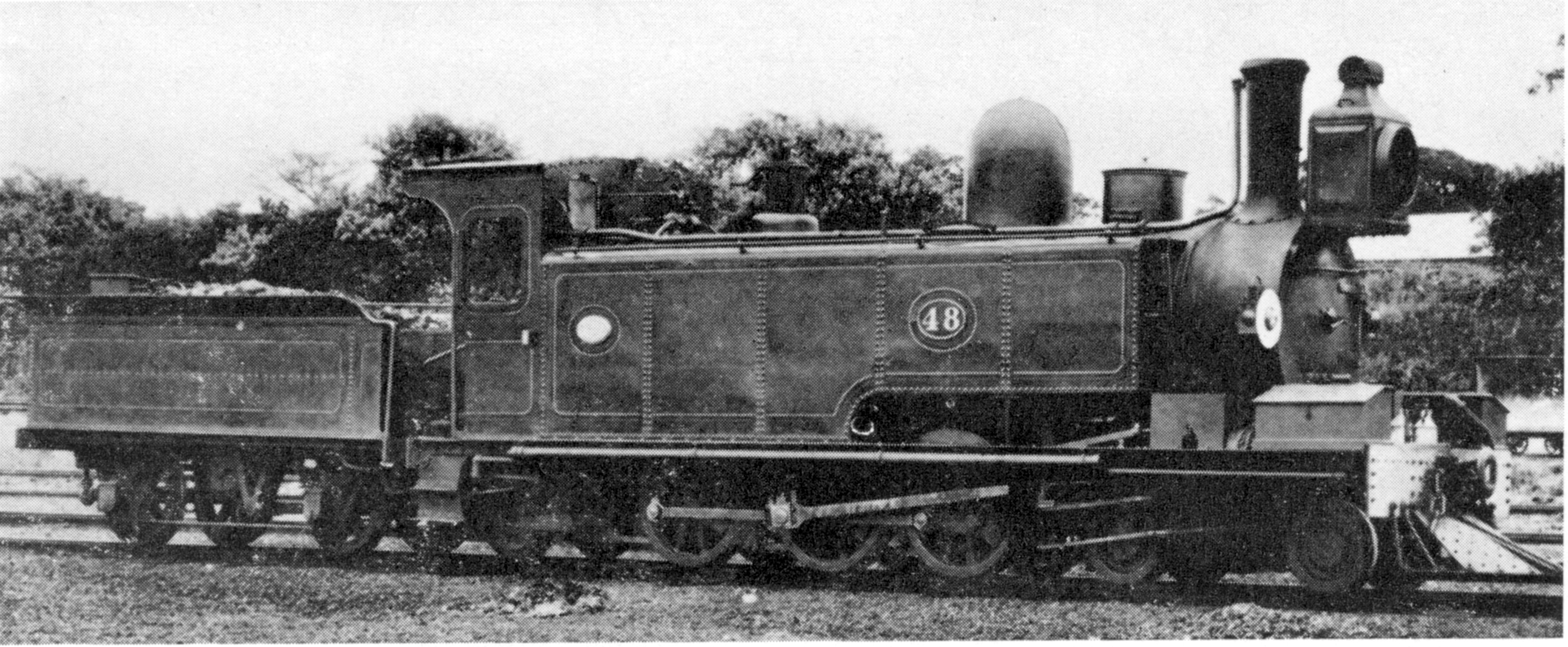
Havelock as a Pacific type, after modification
