= South African type GT tender =

South African steam locomotive tender

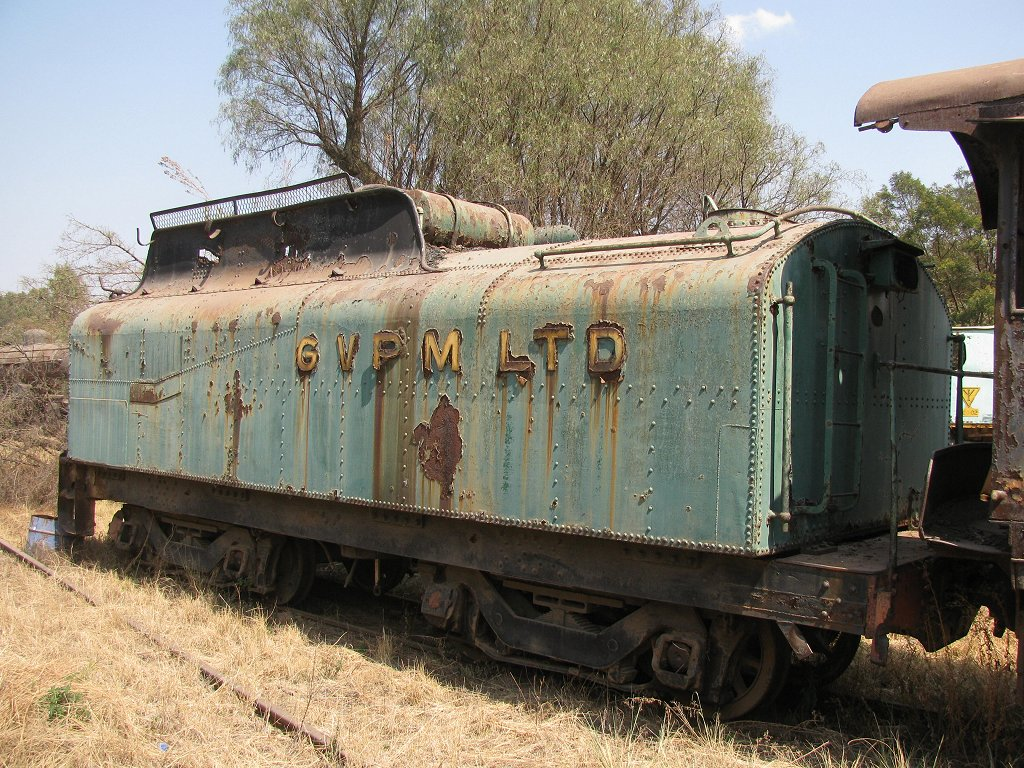
- Type GT tender, 13 June 2009
Type and origin
- Locomotive: Class S
- Designer: South African Railways (Col F.R. Collins DSO)
- Builder: Henschel and Son
- In service: 1929
Specifications
- Configuration: 2-axle bogies
- Gauge: 3 ft 6 in (1,067 mm) Cape gauge
- Length: 30 ft 1 3/4 in (9,188 mm)
- Wheel dia.: 34 in (864 mm)
- Wheelbase: 20 ft 5 in (6,223 mm)
  - Bogie: 6 ft 2 in (1,880 mm)
- Axle load: 15 LT 19 cwt 2 qtr (16,230 kg)
  - Front bogie: 29 LT 4 cwt (29,670 kg)
  - Rear bogie: 31 LT 19 cwt (32,460 kg)
- Weight empty: 58,720 lb (26,630 kg)
- Weight w/o: 61 LT 3 cwt (62,130 kg)
- Fuel type: Coal
- Fuel cap.: 8 LT (8.1 t)
- Water cap.: 6,000 imp gal (27,300 L)
- Stoking: Manual
- Couplers: Drawbar & AAR knuckle
Career
- Operators: South African Railways
- Numbers: SAR 360-373

The South African type GT tender was a steam locomotive tender.

Type GT tenders entered service in 1929, as tenders to the Class S 0-8-0 shunting steam locomotives which were placed in service by the South African Railways in that year.

== Manufacturer ==
Type GT tenders were built in 1928 by Henschel and Son of Kassel in Germany.

The South African Railways (SAR) placed fourteen Class S shunting locomotives in service in 1929. The engines and tenders were built to the design of Col F.R. Collins DSO, Chief Mechanical Engineer of the SAR. They were initially placed in service in Natal and the Orange Free State, but were soon transferred to several centres around Transvaal. The Type GT entered service as tenders to these locomotives.

== Characteristics ==
The tender had a coal capacity of 8 long tons (8.1 tonnes), a water capacity of 6,000 imperial gallons (27,300 litres) and a maximum axle load of 15 long tons 19 hundredweight 2 quarters (16,230 kilograms). To improve the crew's rearward vision, the top sides of the tender's coal bunker were set inwards and the top of the water tank was rounded. An unusual characteristic for a tender was a frame which extended behind the water tank to form a platform, equipped with handrails for use by shunting crew.

== Locomotive ==
Only the Class S locomotives were delivered new with Type GT tenders, which were numbered in the range from 360 to 373 for their engines. An oval number plate, bearing the engine number and tender type, was attached to the rear end of the tender.

== Classification letters ==
Since many tender types are interchangeable between different locomotive classes and types, a tender classification system was adopted by the SAR. The first letter of the tender type indicates the classes of engines to which it can be coupled. The "G_" tenders could only be used with the Class S locomotives with which they were delivered.

The second letter indicates the tender's water capacity. The "_T" tenders had a capacity of between 5,587 and 6,000 imperial gallons (25,400 and 27,300 litres; 6,710 and 7,210 US gallons).

== Illustration ==
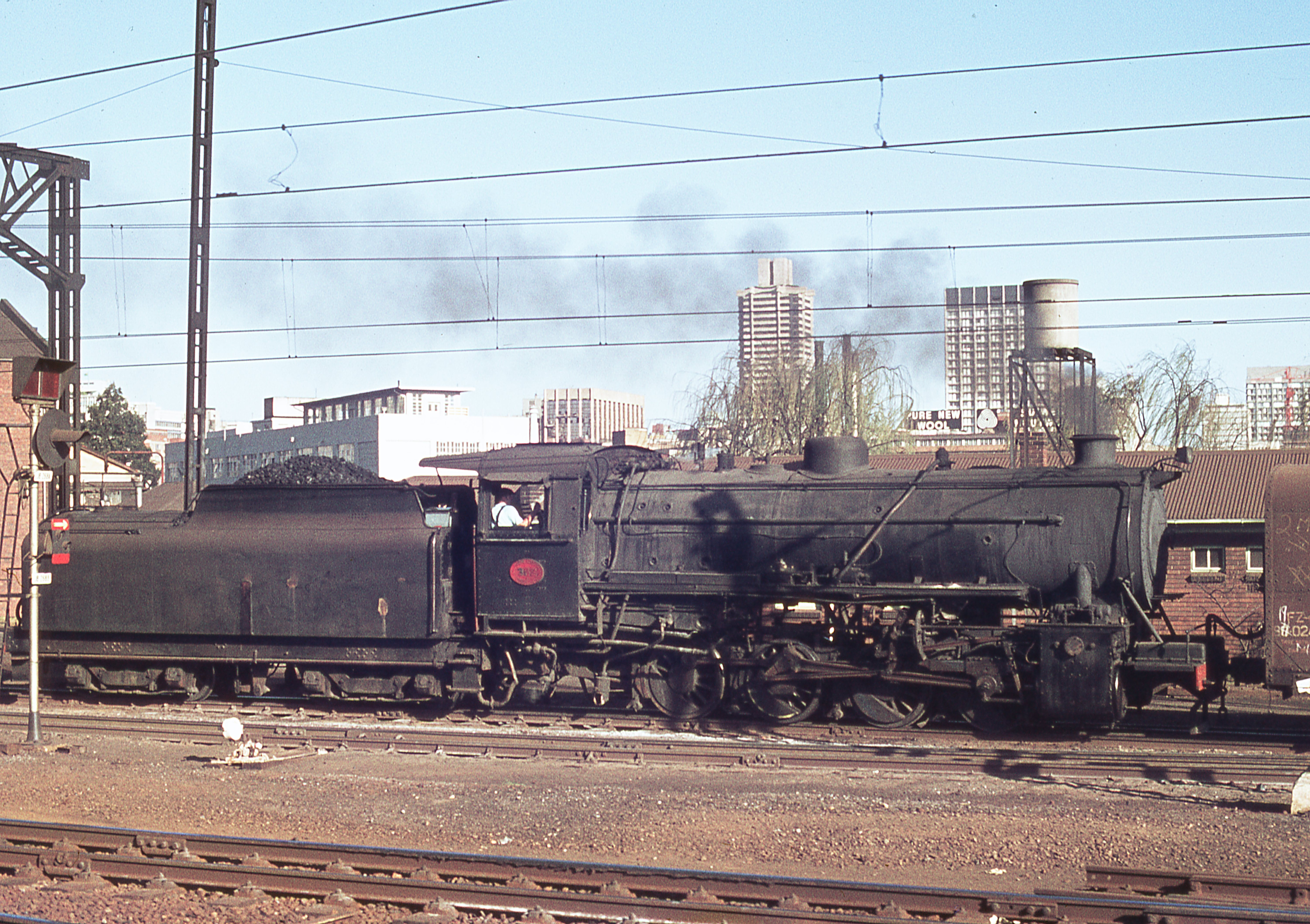
No. 362 at Kimberley, August 1973

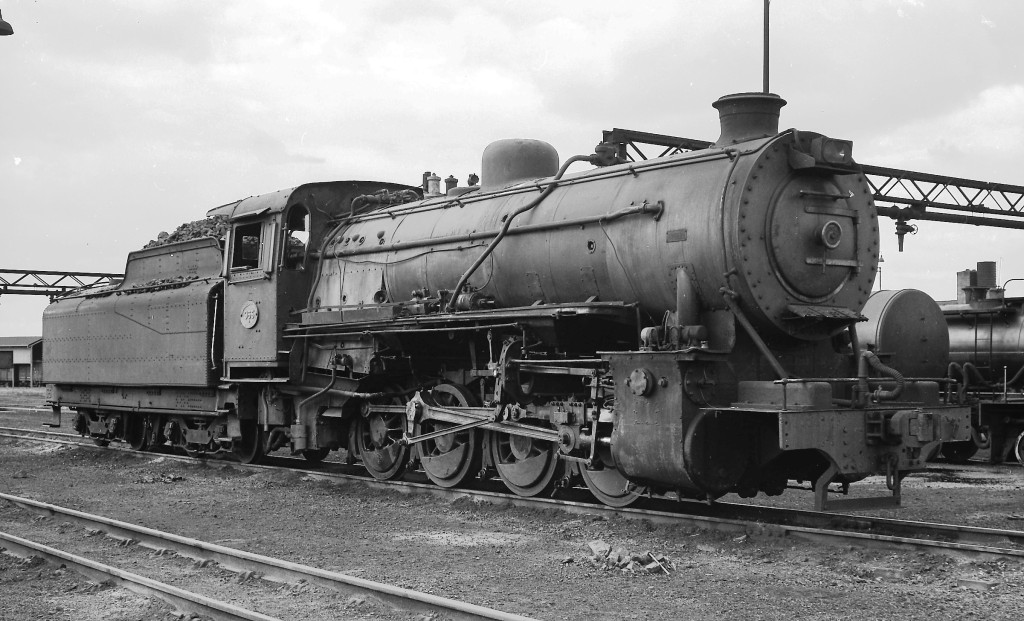
No. 365 at Millsite, Krugersdorp, 8 April 1966
