= South African Class S 0-8-0 =

1929 design of steam shunting locomotive

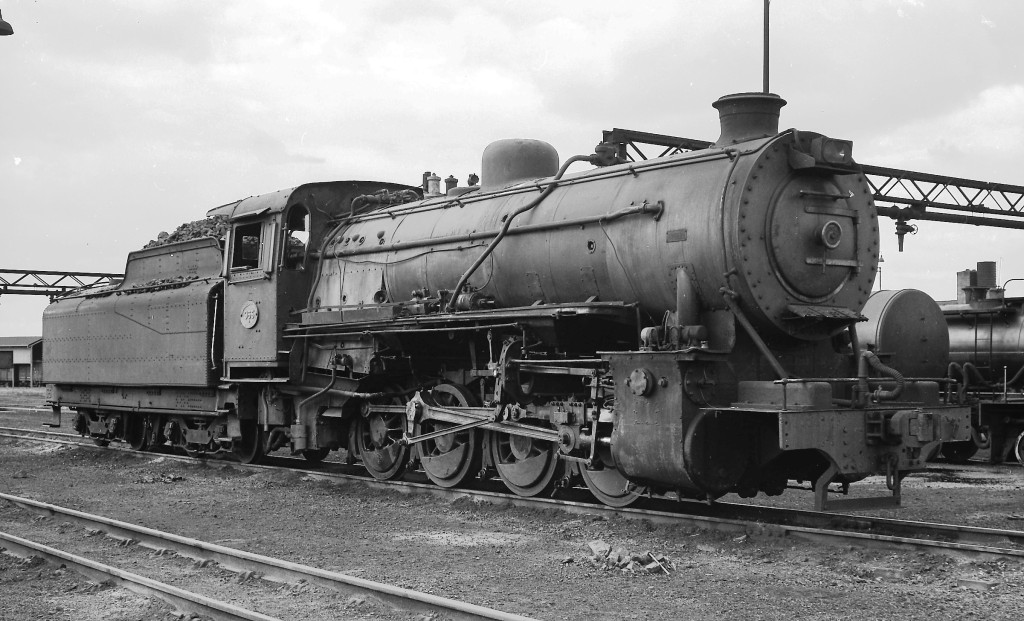
- No. 355 at Millsite, 8 April 1966
Type and origin
- Power type: Steam
- Designer: South African Railways (Col F.R. Collins DSO)
- Builder: Henschel and Son
- Serial number: 21071-21084
- Model: Class S
- Build date: 1928
- Total produced: 14
Specifications
- Configuration
  - Whyte: 0-8-0 (Eight-coupled)
  - UIC: Dh2
- Driver: 3rd coupled axle
- Gauge: 3 ft 6 in (1,067 mm) Cape gauge
- Coupled dia.: 48 in (1,219 mm)
- Tender wheels: 34 in (864 mm)
- Wheelbase: 48 ft 2 1/16 in (14,683 mm)
  - Engine: 14 ft 9 in (4,496 mm)
  - Coupled: 14 ft 9 in (4,496 mm)
  - Tender: 20 ft 5 in (6,223 mm)
  - Tender bogie: 6 ft 2 in (1,880 mm)
- Length
  - Over couplers: 64 ft 10 5/16 in (19,769 mm)
- Height: 13 ft (3,962 mm)
- Frame type: Bar
- Axle load: 18 LT (18,290 kg)
  - Coupled: 18 LT (18,290 kg)
  - Tender bogie: Bogie 1: 29 LT 4 cwt (29,670 kg); Bogie 2: 31 LT 19 cwt (32,460 kg)
  - Tender axle: 15 LT 19 cwt 2 qtr (16,230 kg)
- Adhesive weight: 72 LT (73,160 kg)
- Loco weight: 72 LT (73,160 kg)
- Tender weight: 61 LT 3 cwt (62,130 kg)
- Total weight: 133 LT 3 cwt (135,300 kg)
- Tender type: GT (2-axle bogies)
- Fuel type: Coal
- Fuel capacity: 8 LT (8.1 t)
- Water cap.: 6,000 imp gal (27,300 L)
- Firebox
  - Type: Round-top
  - Grate area: 41 sq ft (3.8 m^{2})
- Boiler
  - Pitch: 8 ft 6 in (2,591 mm)
  - Diameter: 5 ft 6 1/8 in (1,680 mm)
  - Tube plates: 14 ft (4,267 mm)
  - Small tubes: 135: 2 in (51 mm)
  - Large tubes: 28: tubes 5 1/2 in (140 mm)
- Boiler pressure: 170 psi (1,172 kPa)
- Safety valve: Pop
- Heating surface
  - Firebox: 125 sq ft (11.6 m^{2})
  - Tubes: 1,554 sq ft (144.4 m^{2})
  - Arch tubes: 20 sq ft (1.9 m^{2})
  - Total surface: 1,699 sq ft (157.8 m^{2})
- Superheater
  - Heating area: 450 sq ft (42 m^{2})
- Cylinders: Two
- Cylinder size: 23 1/4 in (591 mm) bore 25 in (635 mm) stroke
- Valve gear: Walschaerts
- Valve type: Piston
- Couplers: AAR knuckle
Performance figures
- Tractive effort: 35,890 lbf (159.6 kN) @ 75%
Career
- Operators: South African Railways
- Class: Class S
- Number in class: 14
- Numbers: 360–373
- Delivered: 1929
- First run: 1929
- Withdrawn: 1976
- The 3rd coupled axle had flangeless wheels

The South African Railways Class S 0-8-0 of 1929 was a steam locomotive.

In 1929, the South African Railways placed fourteen purpose-built Class S steam shunting locomotives with an 0-8-0 wheel arrangement in service.

== Background ==
Throughout the history of railways in South Africa, shunting was traditionally performed by downgraded mainline locomotives. Considering the enormous amount of shunting performed, the number of dedicated shunting locomotives on the South African Railways (SAR) roster in the steam era was remarkably low, amounting to only 151 locomotives on a railway whose steam stock at one stage reached a maximum of nearly 2,800 locomotives.

When it did eventually introduce purpose-built shunting locomotives, the SAR preferred to adhere to the American practice of using tender locomotives for shunting rather than the European practice of using tank engines.

== Manufacturer ==
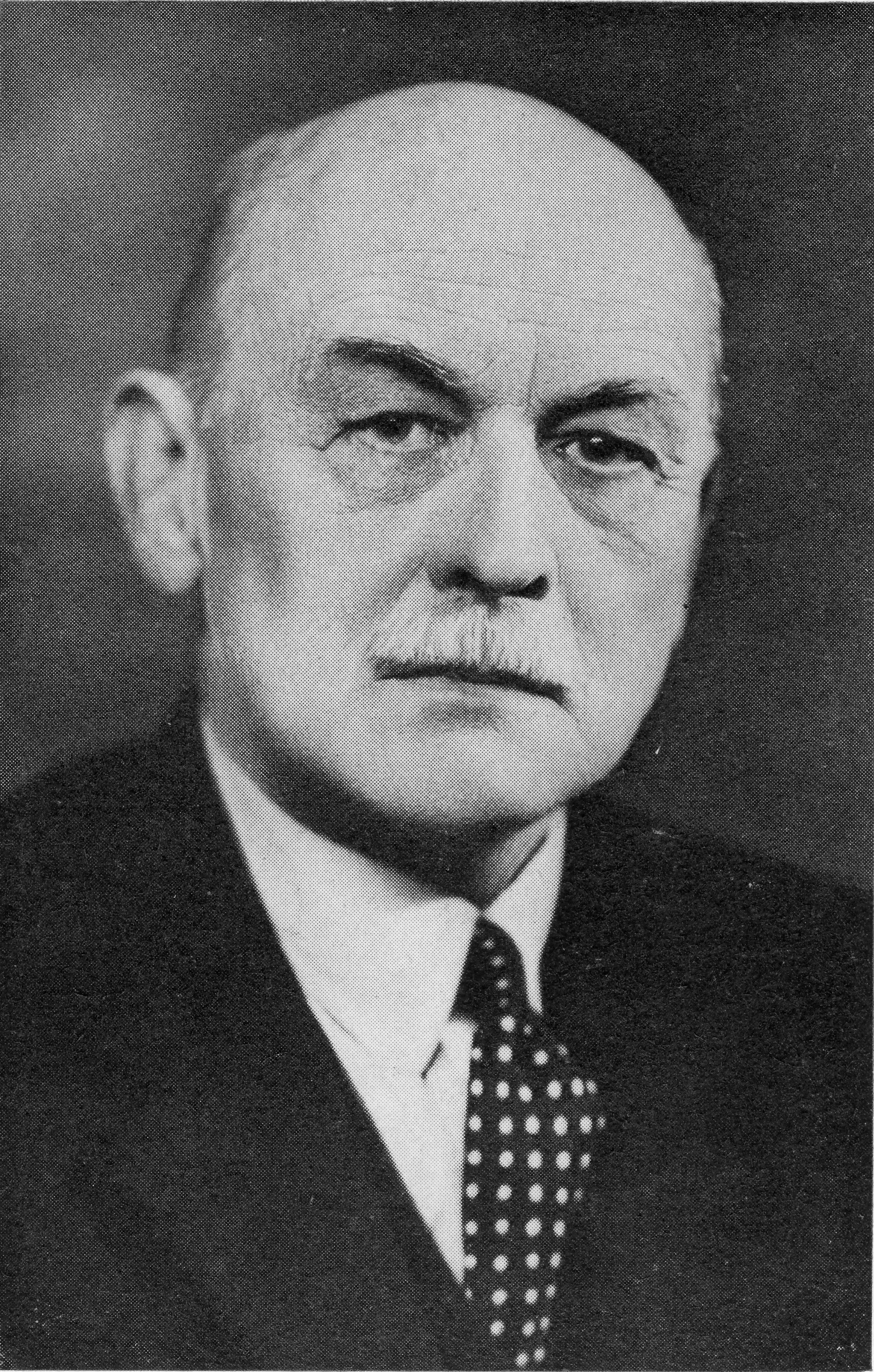
Col F.R. Collins DSO

In spite of the conversion of Class A tank locomotives to Class 17 tank-and-tender shunting locomotives, increasing rail traffic throughout the country and particularly on the Witwatersrand in the 1920s still made it necessary to use heavy mainline locomotives for shunting work. Specifications for the Class S 0-8-0 tender type steam shunting locomotive were therefore prepared by Colonel F.R. Collins DSO, Chief Mechanical Engineer of the SAR.

In 1928, fourteen locomotives were built to the SAR specifications by Henschel and Son in Germany. They were delivered in 1929 and numbered in the range from 360 to 373. Since they were designed to operate at low speeds in tightly curved shunting yards, there was no need for the leading or trailing wheels which are necessary on mainline locomotives to improve high speed stability. In addition, it was desirable to have as large a proportion of the engine weight as possible carried on the coupled wheels to obtain the maximum adhesion possible.

== Characteristics ==
The Class S locomotives were superheated, were built on bar frames and used Walschaerts valve gear with piston valves. They were delivered with Type GT tenders with a fuel capacity of 8 long tons (8.1 tonnes), a water capacity of 6,000 imperial gallons (27,300 litres) and a maximum axle load of 15 long tons 19 hundredweight 2 quarters (16,230 kilograms). To improve the crew's rearward vision, the top sides of the tender's coal bunker were set inwards and the water tank top was rounded.

When they were first introduced, their boiler pressure was set at 216 pounds per square inch (1,489 kilopascals), giving a tractive effort of 45,500 pounds-force (202 kilonewtons) at 75% boiler pressure. Since they tended to be slippery, however, the operating boiler pressure was reduced to 170 pounds per square inch (1,172 kilopascals) in 1933, resulting in a corresponding reduction in tractive effort to 35,890 pounds-force (159.6 kilonewtons) at 75% boiler pressure.

== Service ==
=== South African Railways ===
The Class S was initially placed in service in the Orange Free State and Natal, but they were soon transferred to Transvaal where they spent most of the rest of their working lives, rendering good service in yards at several centres. The Class ended up being mainly a Western Transvaal locomotive, stationed at Germiston, Kaserne, Krugersdorp, Springs and at Beaconsfield in Kimberley, with a solitary locomotive at Volksrust. The bulk of them spent all their working lives in Braamfontein.

=== Industrial ===
They were withdrawn from SAR service in 1976. Four were sold to Dunn's in 1977, from where they eventually ended up at several locations.

- No. 362 went to Apex Mines at Greenside as no. 6.
- No. 365 went to Tweefontein United Colliery and later to Enyati Colliery.
- No. 367 went to Apex Mines as no. 5 and later to Grootvlei Proprietary Mines at Springs, first as no. 3 Big Mac and later renumbered to 2.
- No. 369 went to Grootvlei Proprietary Mines (GVPM), first as no. 2 King Kong and later renumbered to 1.

== Preservation ==
Number	Works nmr	THF / Private	Leaselend / Owner	Current Location	Outside South Africa	?
360	HENSC 21071	THF		Krugersdorp Locomotive Depot		

== Illustration ==
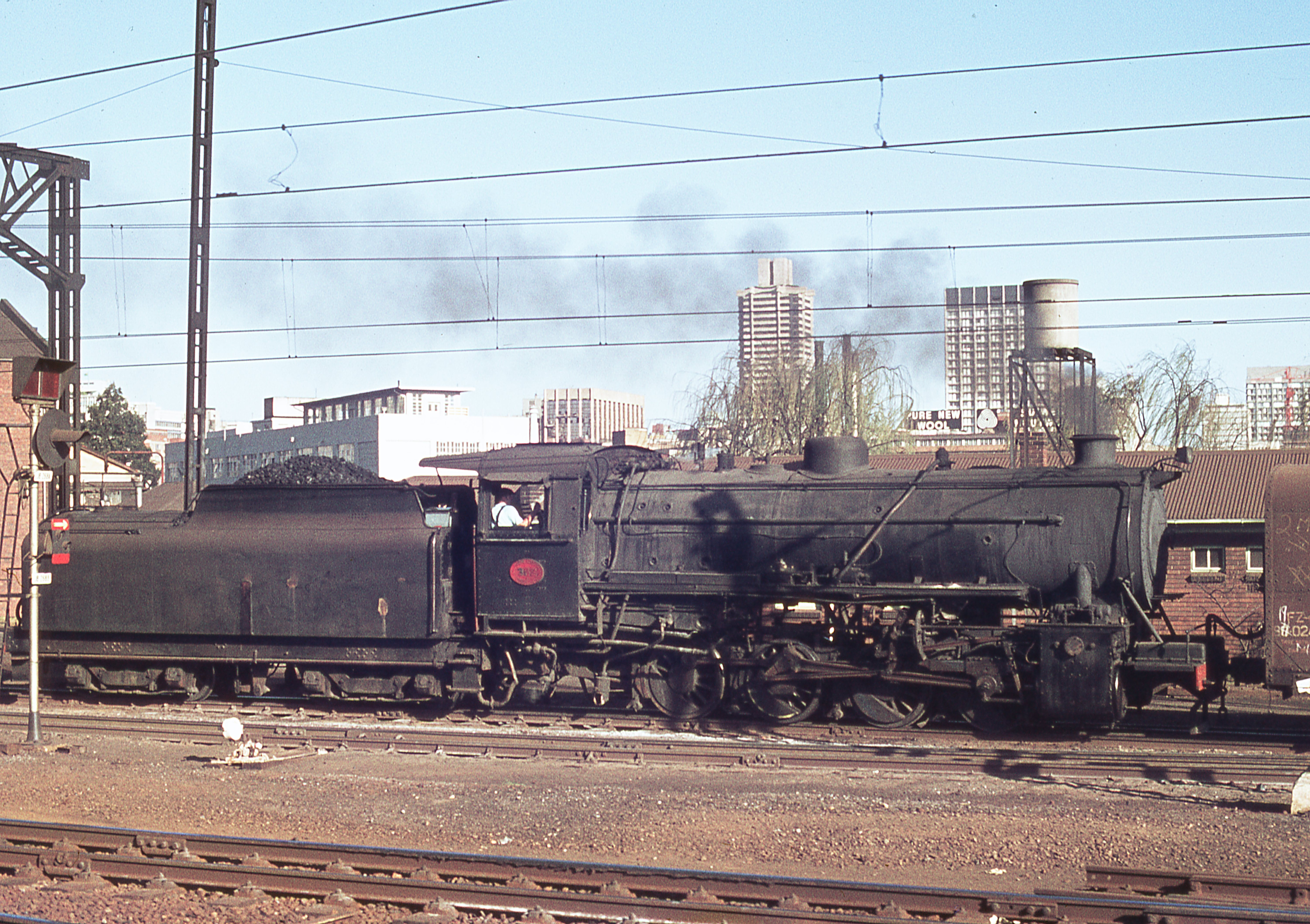
No. 362 at Braamfontein, August 1973

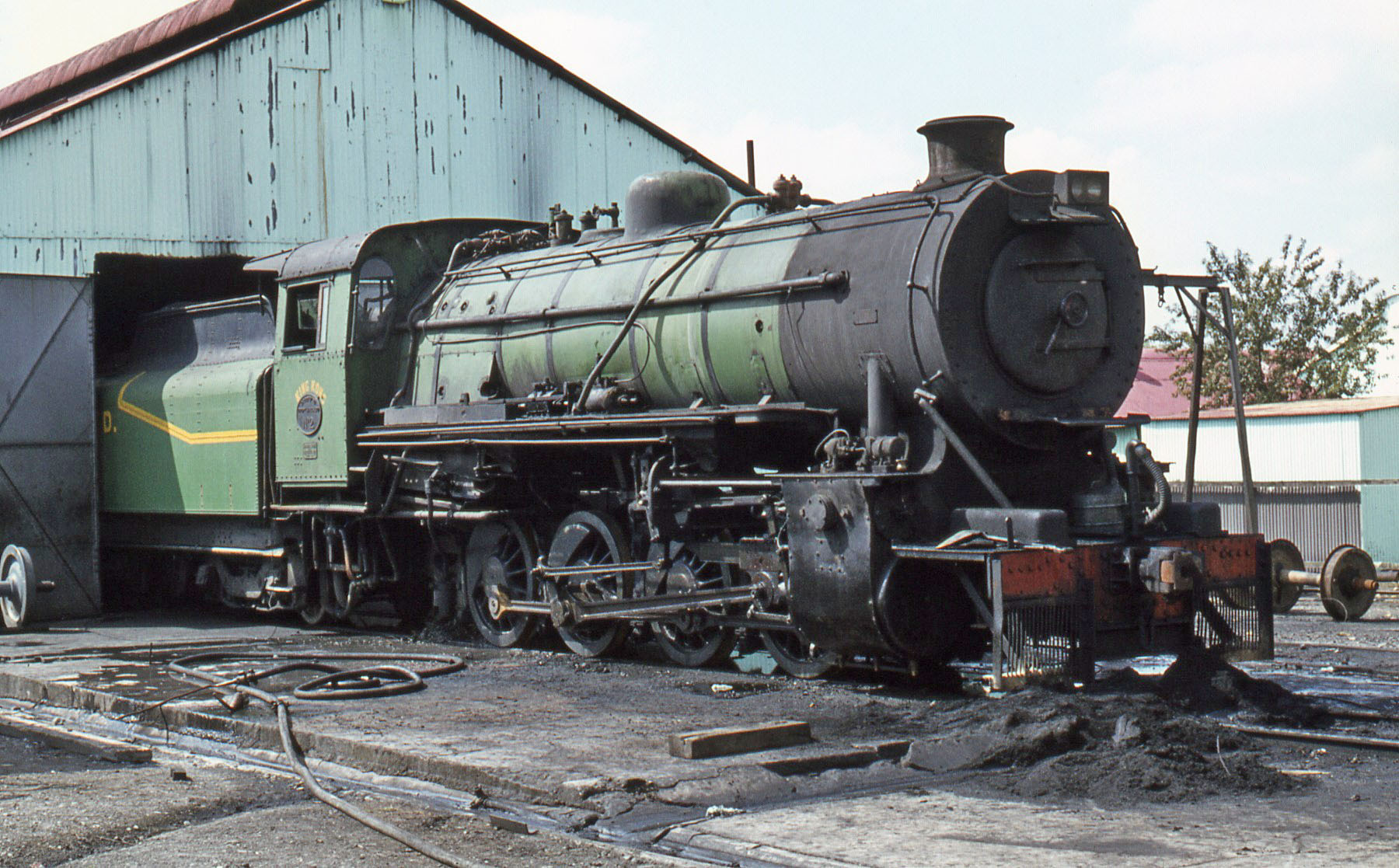
GVPM no. 2 King Kong, 23 April 1979
