= 1901 in South Africa =

- Decades: 1880s; 1890s; 1900s; 1910s; 1920s
- See also: List of years in South Africa

The following lists events that happened during 1901 in South Africa.

== Incumbents ==
=== Cape Colony ===
- Governor of the Cape of Good Hope and High Commissioner for Southern Africa:Alfred Milner then Walter Hely-Hutchinson (governor from 6 March but not high commissioner).
- Prime Minister of the Cape of Good Hope: John Gordon Sprigg.

=== Natal ===
- Governor of the Colony of Natal: Charles Bullen Hugh Mitchell (until 6 May), Henry Edward McCallum (starting 6 May).
- Prime Minister of the Colony of Natal: Albert Henry Hime.

=== Orange Free State ===
- State President of the Orange Free State: Martinus Theunis Steyn.
- Administrator of British-occupied Orange River Colony and UK High Commissioner for Southern Africa: Alfred Milner, 1st Viscount Milner.

=== South African Republic ===
- State President of the South African Republic: Paul Kruger (in exile); Schalk Willem Burger (acting).
- Administrator of British-occupied Transvaal and UK High Commissioner for Southern Africa: Alfred Milner, 1st Viscount Milner.

== Events ==
January

- 9 – Herbert Kitchener reports that Christiaan de Wet has shot a British peace envoy and flogged two more who had gone to his commando to ask the Burghers to halt fighting.
- 15 – HMS Sybille, a 3,400-ton Apollo-class cruiser, strikes a reef about 5 km (3.1 mi) south of Lamberts Bay.
- 31 – General Jan Smuts and his commandos capture Modderfontein.

February

- 1 – Bubonic plague breaks out in Cape Town.
- 26 – The Middelburg peace conference fails as Boers continue to demand autonomy.

May

- 31 – Officially unrecognized Zulu king Dinuzulu kaCetshwayo refuses British instructions to take up arms against the Boers.

June

- 18 – Emily Hobhouse reports on the high mortality and cruel conditions in the Second Boer War concentration camps
- 25 – Boer armies invaded the Cape Colony and attacked the British settlement of Richmond for a day, then retreated as British forces approached.

July

- 2–6 – Nine Boer prisoners-of-war are murdered by Australian members of the Bushveldt Carbineers in the Spelonken area near Louis Trichardt.
- 16 – The Fawcett Commission is established to look at living conditions of women and children, including water supply, sanitation, medical care and the mortality and birth rates in the concentration camps.

August

- 4 – Lieutenant-general Paul Methuen destroys the village of Schweizer-Reneke under the British scorched earth policy.
- 20 – General Koos de la Rey's 84-year-old mother is sent to a concentration camp at Klerksdorp.

September

- 17 – Commandant-General Louis Botha and General Cecil "Cherry" Cheere Emmett join forces to invade Natal.

October

- Mahatma Gandhi embarks at Durban for Mauritius en route to Bombay.

November

- 1 – Standard Bank opens its second branch in Johannesburg on Eloff Street.
- 9 – The electric tramline in Cape Town is extended from Sea Point to Camps Bay.
- 18 – Boer commandos invade the Cape Colony and come to within 50 miles of Cape Town.

December

- 22 – On Peace Sunday Charles Frederic Aked (1864–1941), a Baptist minister in Liverpool, says: "Great Britain cannot win the battles without resorting to the last despicable cowardice of the most loathsome cur on earth; the act of striking a brave man's heart through his wife's honour and his child's life. The cowardly war has been conducted by methods of barbarism... the concentration camps have been Murder Camps." A crowd follows him home and breaks the windows of his house.

== Births ==
- 24 January – Harry Calder, South African cricketer. (d. 1995)
- 9 September – Hendrik Frensch Verwoerd, Prime Minister of South Africa. (assassinated 1966) (born in the Netherlands)

== Deaths ==
- 19 May – Marthinus Wessel Pretorius, first president of the South African Republic and founder of Pretoria, at age 81.

== Railways ==
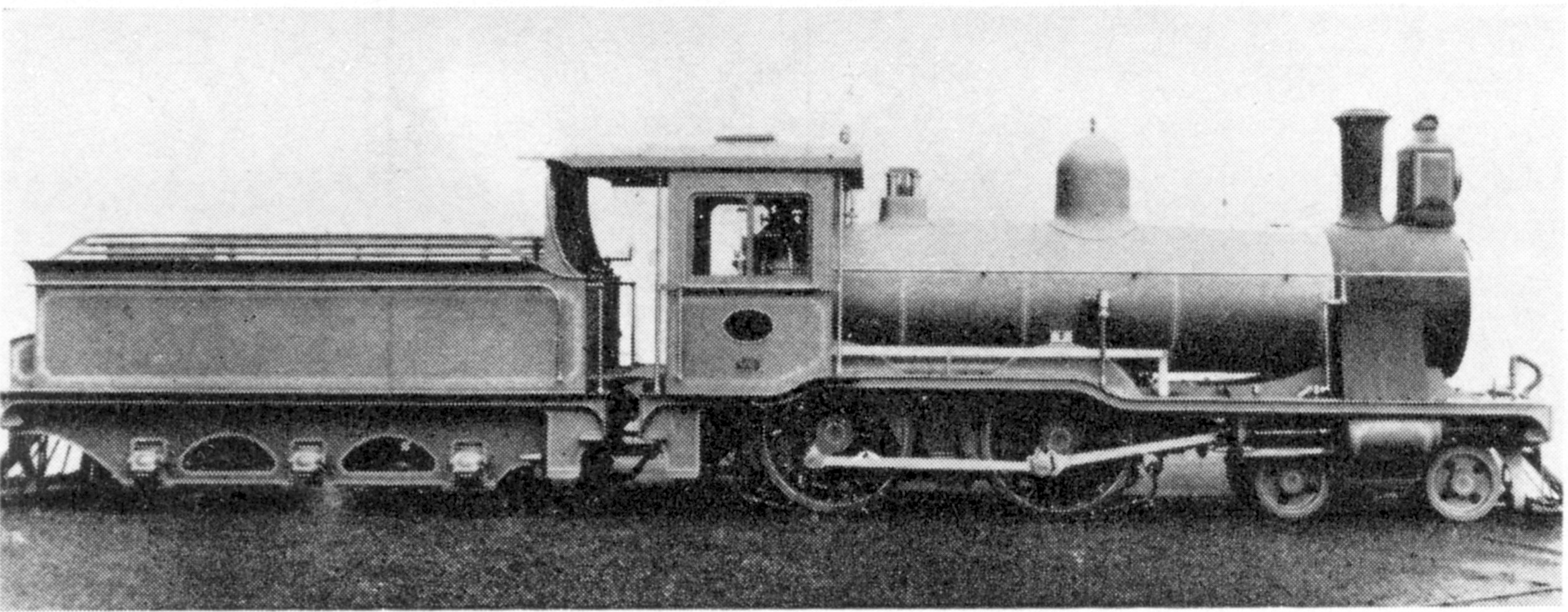
CGR 3rd Class Wynberg Tender

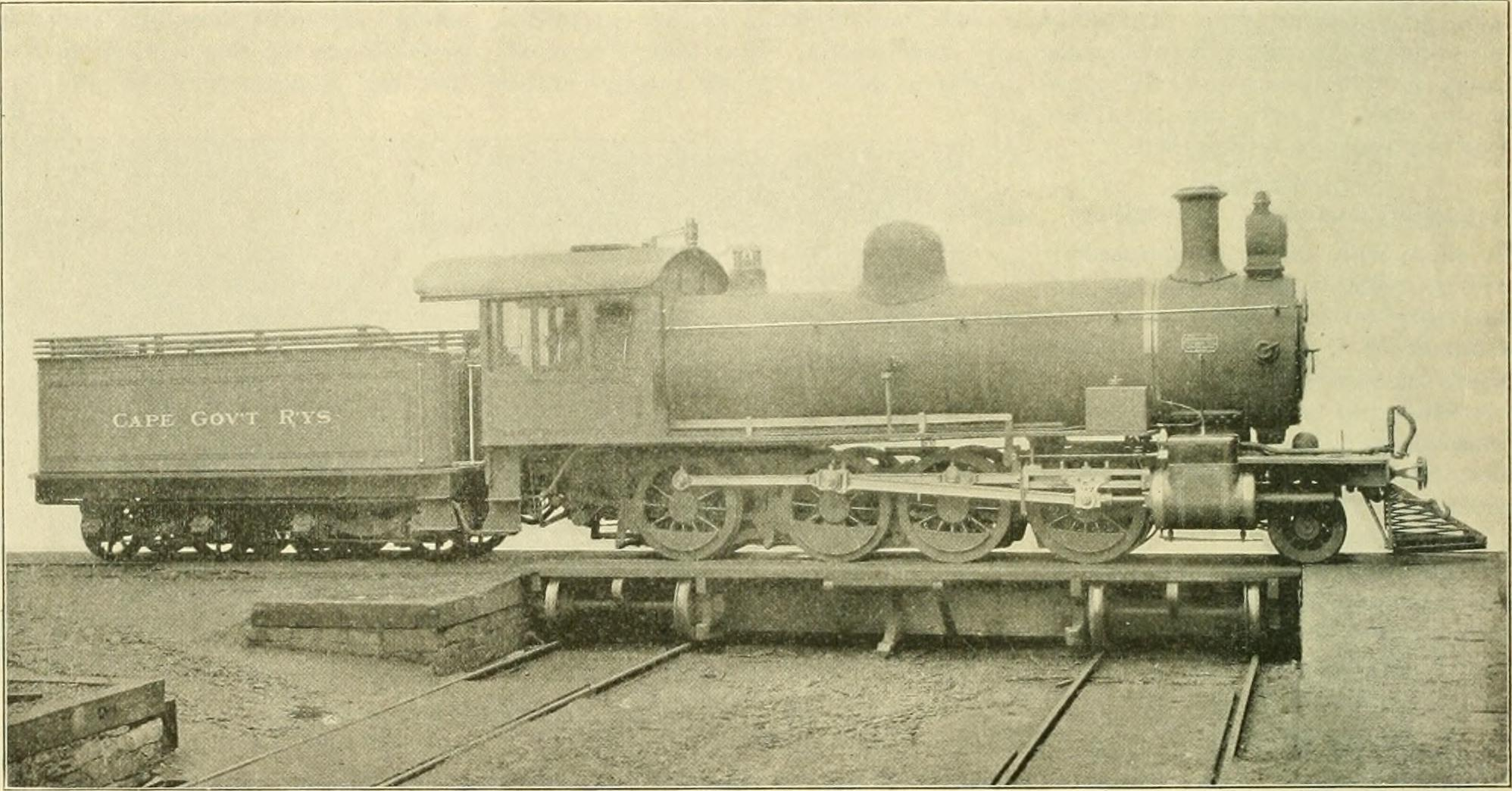
CGR 8th Class

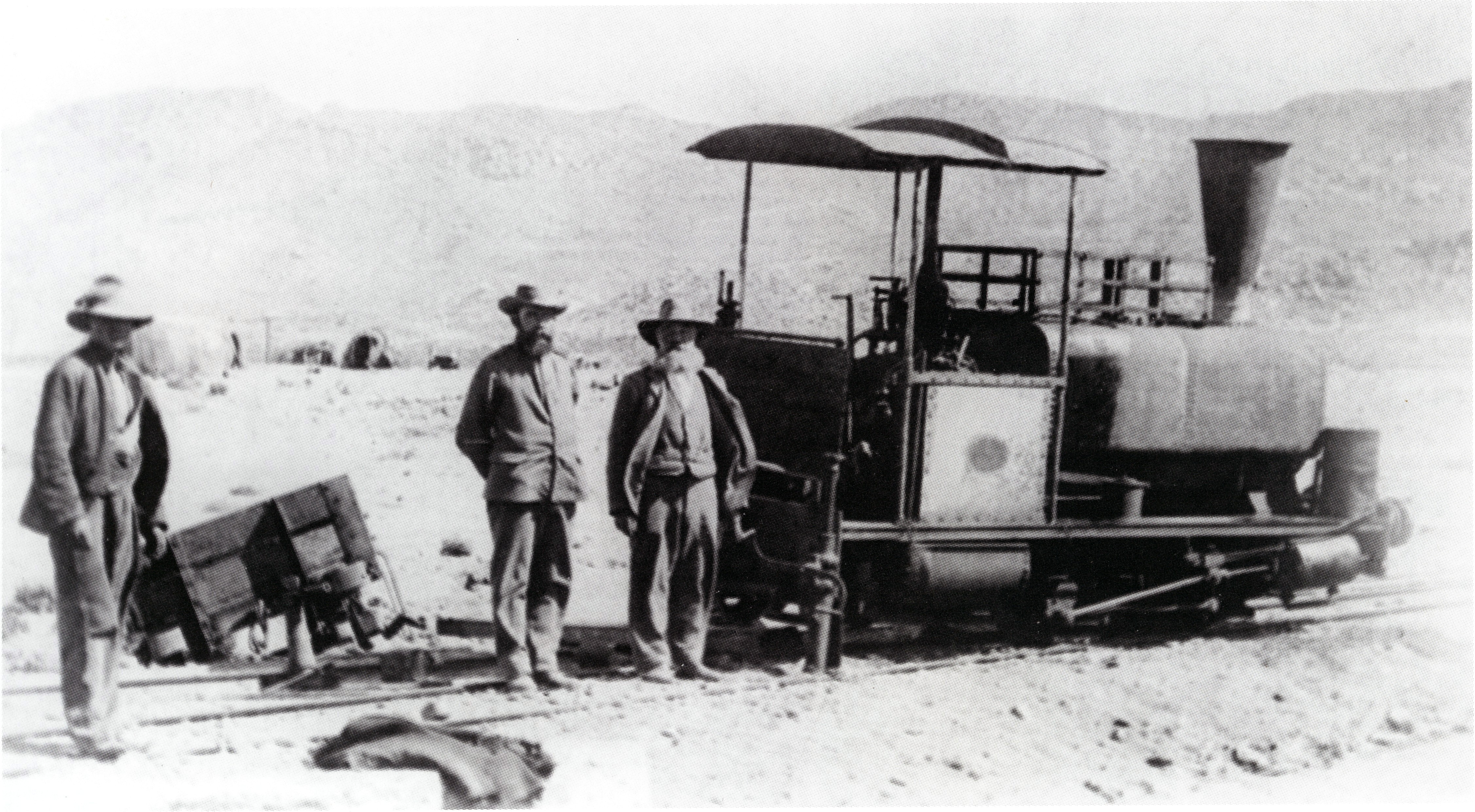
NCC Pioneer

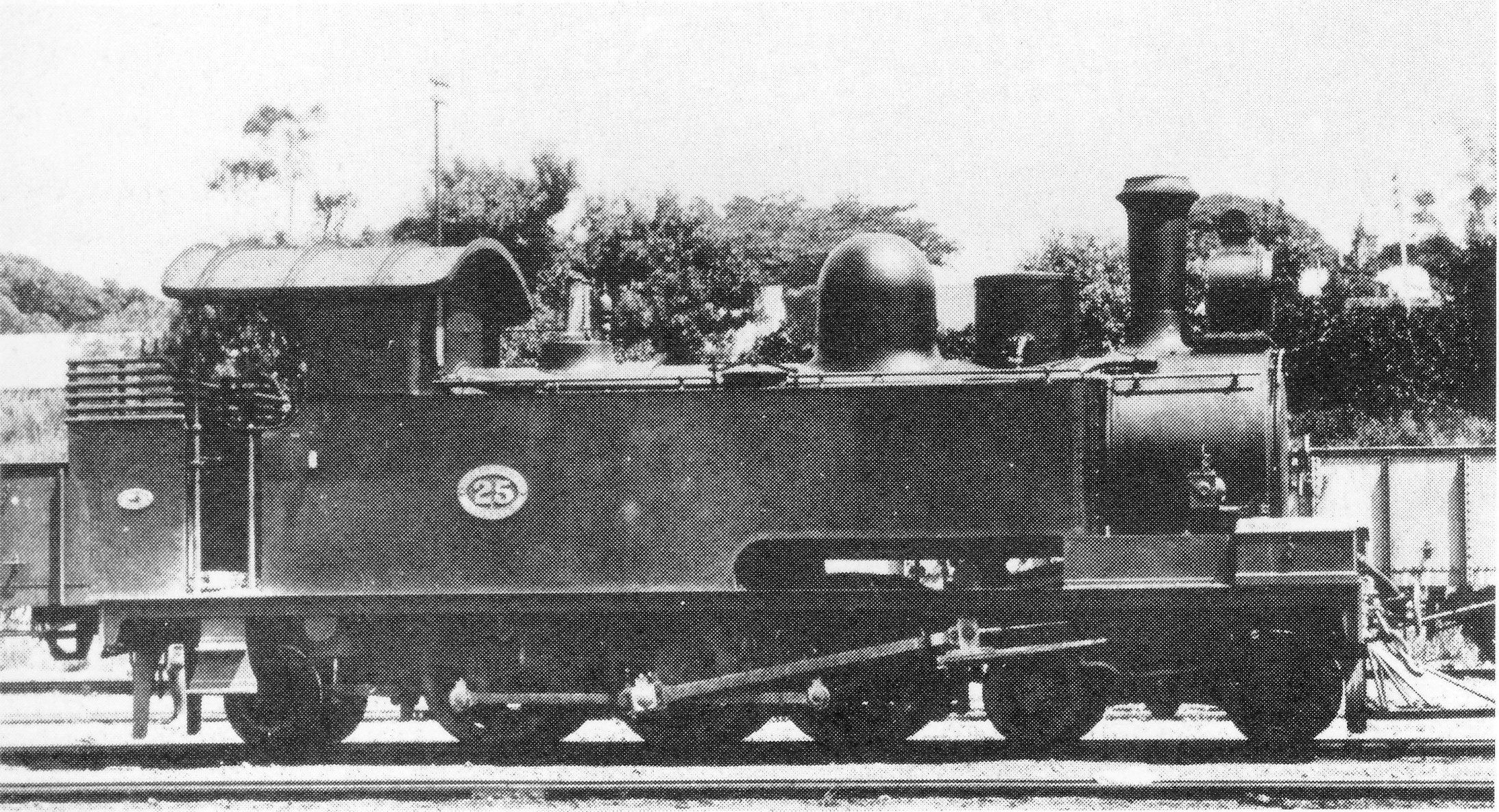
SAR Class C1

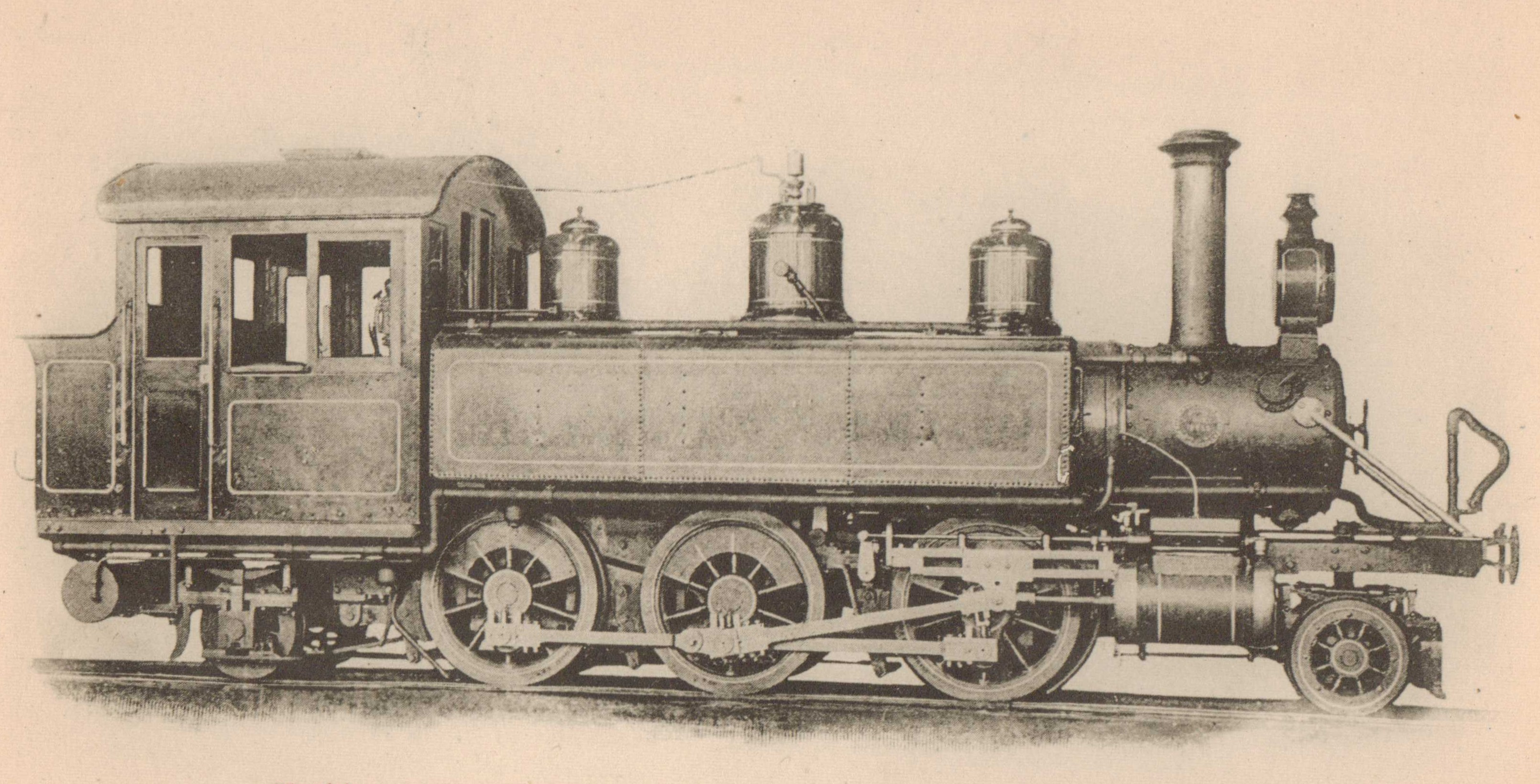
Zululand Railway Co. 2-6-2

=== Railway lines opened ===
- 13 March – Natal – Stanger to Kearsney, 8 miles (12.9 kilometres).
- 27 July – Natal – Mtwalume to North Shepstone, 20 miles 70 chains (33.6 kilometres).
- 9 September – Cape Western – Malmesbury to Moorreesburg, 30 miles 51 chains (49.3 kilometres).

=== Locomotives ===
Cape

- Six new Cape gauge locomotive types enter service on the Cape Government Railways (CGR):
  - Six 4-4-0 3rd Class Wynberg Tender locomotives in suburban service in Cape Town.
  - Eight redesigned American-built 6th Class 4-6-0 steam locomotives. In 1912 they would be designated Class 6G on the South African Railways (SAR).
  - 21 6th Class 4-6-0 steam locomotives, built to the older designs with plate frames. In 1912 they would be reclassified to Class 6H on the SAR.
  - Ten American-built 6th Class 4-6-0 bar framed locomotives. In 1912 they would be designated Class 6K on the SAR.
  - Four 6th Class 2-6-2 Prairie type locomotives that are soon modified to a 2-6-4 Adriatic type wheel arrangement. In 1912 they would be designated Class 6Z on the SAR.
  - The first of sixteen 8th Class 2-8-0 Consolidation type locomotives. In 1912 they would be designated Class 8X on the SAR.
- The Namaqua Copper Company acquires its first locomotive, a 0-4-2 saddle-tank shunting engine named Pioneer.

Natal

- The Natal Government Railways (NGR) rebuilds one of its Class G 4-6-0 tank locomotives to a Class H 4-6-2T Pacific wheel arrangement. In 1912 it would be designated Class C1 on the SAR.
- The Natal Harbours Department places a single 0-6-0 side-tank locomotive named Edward Innes in service as harbour shunter in Durban Harbour.
- The Zululand Railway Company, contracted for the construction of the line from Verulam to Tugela River, acquires one 2-6-2 tank locomotive.

Transvaal

- The Imperial Military Railways places 35 tank locomotives in service, built to the design of the Reid Tenwheeler of the NGR.
