= 1900 in South Africa =

- Decades: 1880s; 1890s; 1900s; 1910s; 1920s
- See also: List of years in South Africa

The following lists events that happened during 1900 in South Africa.

== Incumbents ==
- Monarch: Queen Victoria
- Governor of the Cape of Good Hope and High Commissioner for Southern Africa:Alfred Milner.
- Governor of the Colony of Natal: Charles Bullen Hugh Mitchell.
- State President of the Orange Free State: Martinus Theunis Steyn.
- State President of the South African Republic: Paul Kruger.
- Prime Minister of the Cape of Good Hope: William Philip Schreiner (until 17 June), John Gordon Sprigg (starting 17 June).
- Prime Minister of the Colony of Natal: Albert Henry Hime.

== Events ==
January

- 10 – Frederick Roberts arrives at Cape Town to replace Redvers Henry Buller as commander-in-chief of the British forces in South Africa, accompanied by Herbert Kitchener as his chief-of-staff.
- 10 – Barolong chief Wessel Montshiwa advises his people not to assist the British during the siege of Mafeking.
- 19–24 – Boer forces under the command of Louis Botha defeat the British forces under the command of Redvers Buller during the Battle of Spioenkop.
- 21 – George Labram completes the gun Long Cecil during the Siege of Kimberley.
- 24 – The Boer government of the Transvaal holds peace talks with the British.

February

- 5 – British forces under the command of Redvers Henry Buller attack Boer forces under the command of Louis Botha and are defeated during the Battle of Vaal Krantz.
- 14 – British reinforcements arrive.
- 15 – The Siege of Kimberley is relieved by a cavalry division under General John French.
- 18–27 – British forces under command of Frederick Roberts defeat the Boers during the Battle of Paardeberg.
- 27 – General Piet Cronje is captured.
- 28 – The Siege of Ladysmith ends with the successful Relief of Ladysmith.

March

- 13 – British forces under command of Frederick Roberts take Bloemfontein.
- 13 – A Joint Diplomatic Delegation consisting of Abraham Fischer and C.H. Wessels for the Orange Free State and A.D.W. Wolmarans for the South African Republic, with J.M. de Bruin as secretary, embarks at Lourenço Marques for Europe and the United States, seeking international intervention in the South African War and aid for the beleaguered Boer republics.

May

- 3 – The Battle of Brandfort takes place between British forces under command of Frederick Roberts and the Boers under command of General De la Rey.
- 18 – The Siege of Mafeking is relieved.
- 28 – The Orange Free State is annexed to the Cape Colony.

June

- 5 – British forces under command of Frederick Roberts take Pretoria.
- 11 – British forces under command of B.T. Mahon occupies Potchefstroom.

July

- 2 – British forces occupy Utrecht after defeating the defending citizens the previous day.
- 3 – The British abandons Utrecht upon receiving reports of General Grobler's approach.
- 3 – British forces under Col. Baden-Powell evacuate Rustenburg.

August

- 21–27 – The Battle of Bergendal between the Boers and British forces takes place on the farm Bergendal near Belfast.
- 28 – British troops march into Machadodorp.

October

- Britain annexes Transvaal

November

- 29 – Herbert Kitchener succeeds Frederick Roberts as commander-in-chief of the British forces in South Africa and implements a scorched earth strategy.

December

- 27 – Emily Hobhouse arrives in Cape Town.

== Births ==
- 26 March – Jackie Tindall, Springbok rugby union player, is born in Stellenbosch.
- 14 May – Johannes du Plessis Scholtz, linguist, author and historian, is born in the Hottentots-Holland district of the Cape Colony.

== Deaths ==
- 28 March – Petrus Jacobus Joubert, a South African Republic Triumvirate member, dies from peritonitis at the age of 76 at Pretoria.
- 3 June – Mary Kingsley, an English ethnographer, scientific writer, and explorer, dies when contracting typhoid from helping Boer POWs
- 29 October – Prince Christian Victor of Schleswig-Holstein, eldest son of Princess Helena, third daughter of Queen Victoria, dies after contracting malaria during the Boer War

== Railways ==
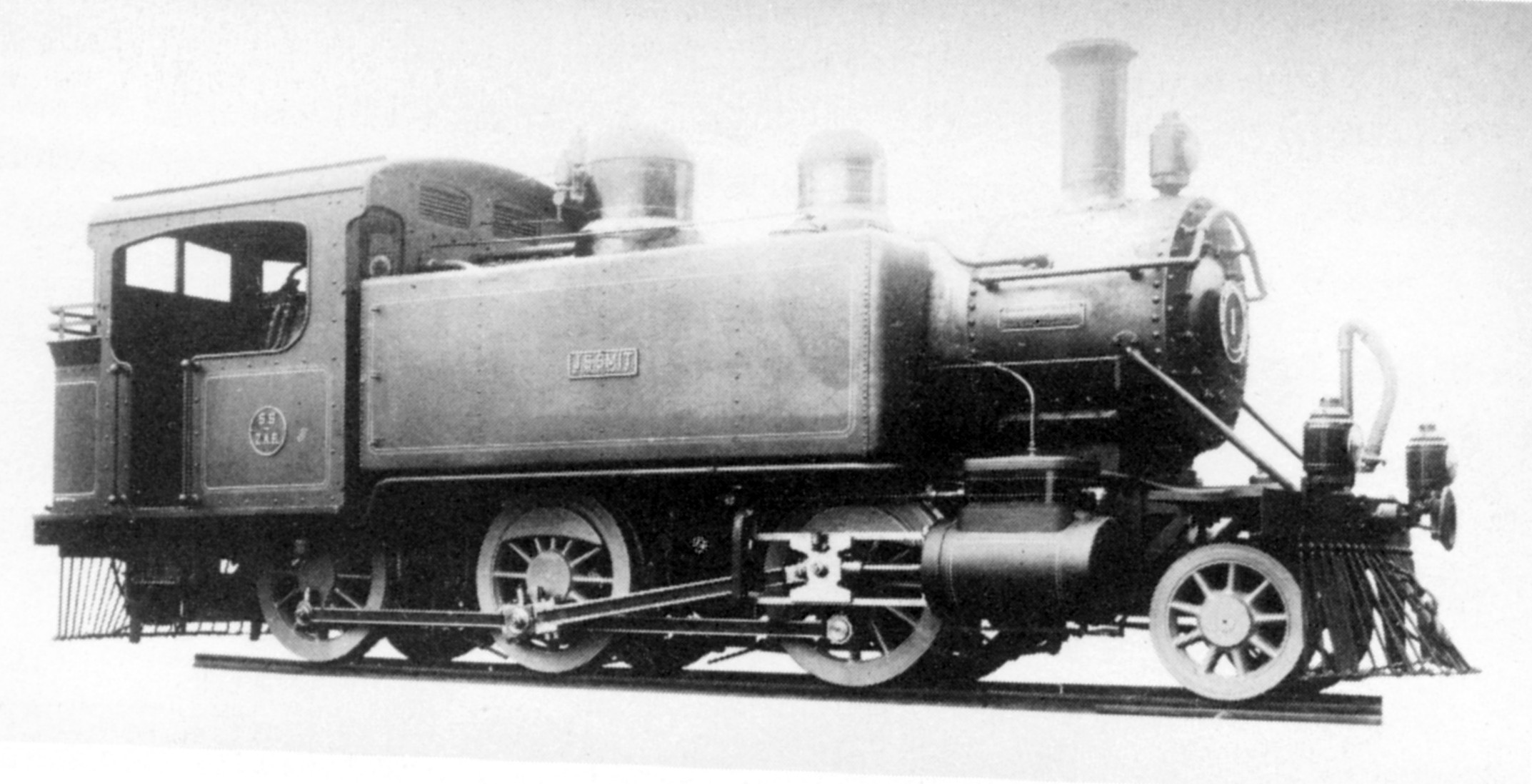
CGR 3rd Class

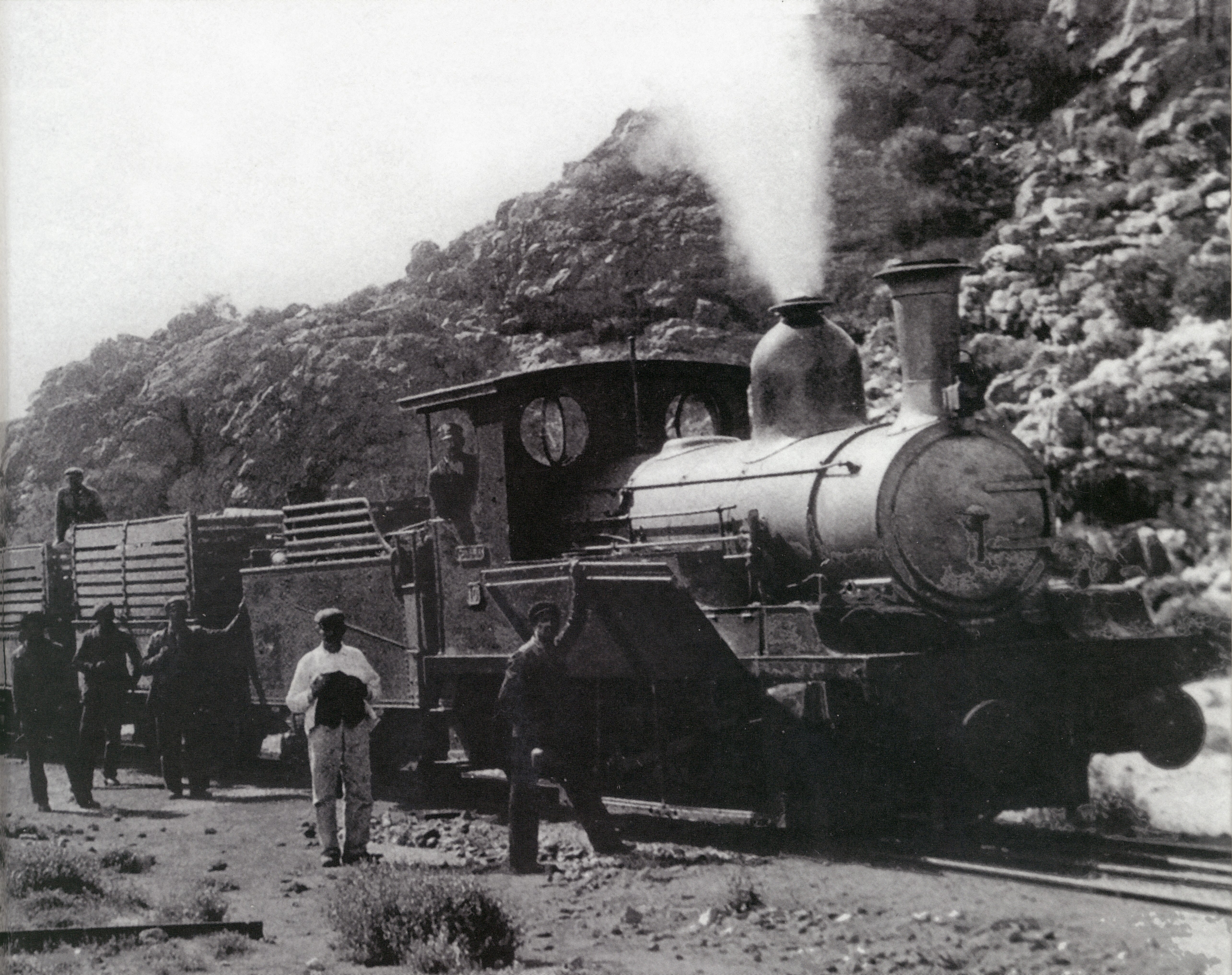
Cape Copper Scotia Class

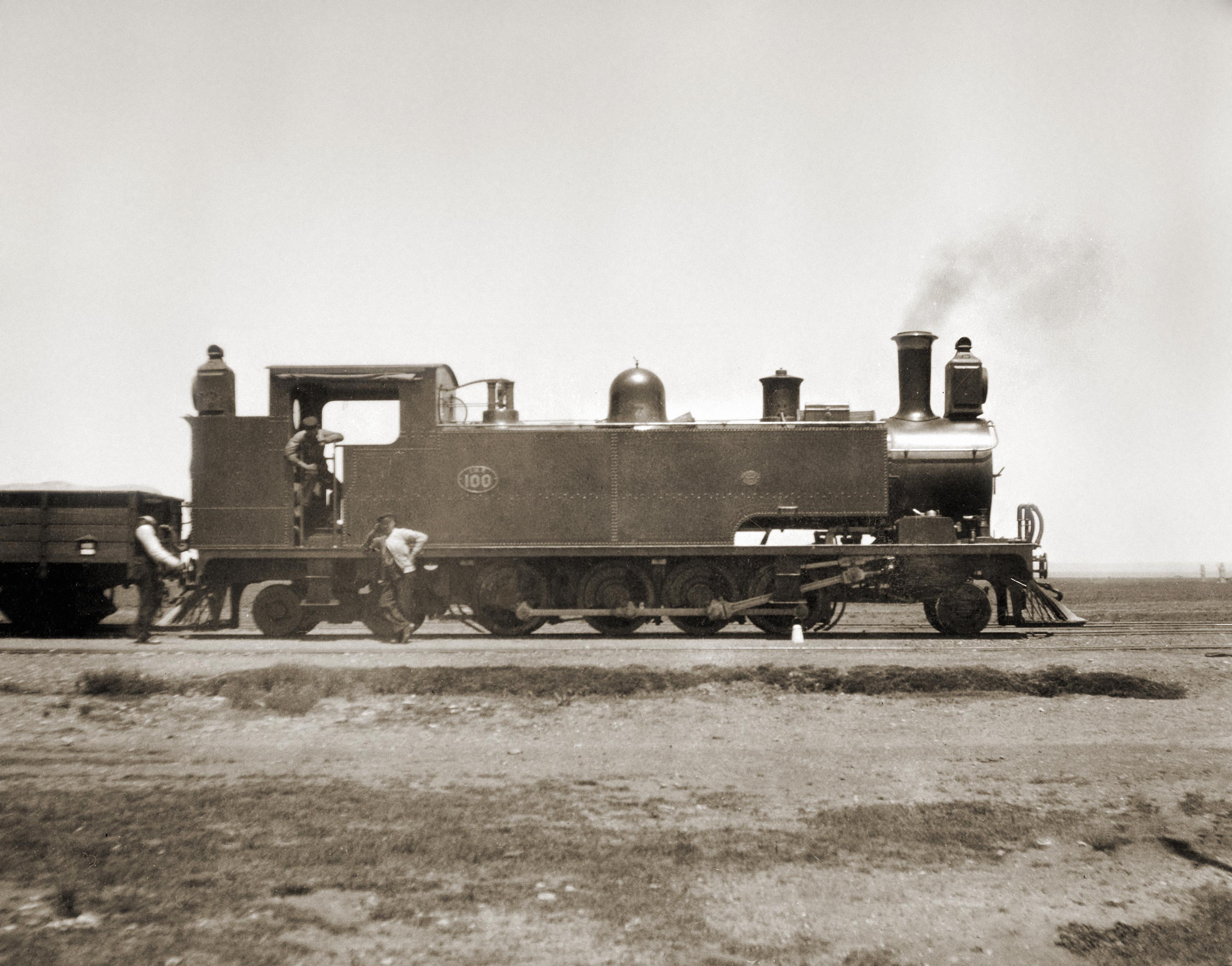
CSAR Class C Western Australian

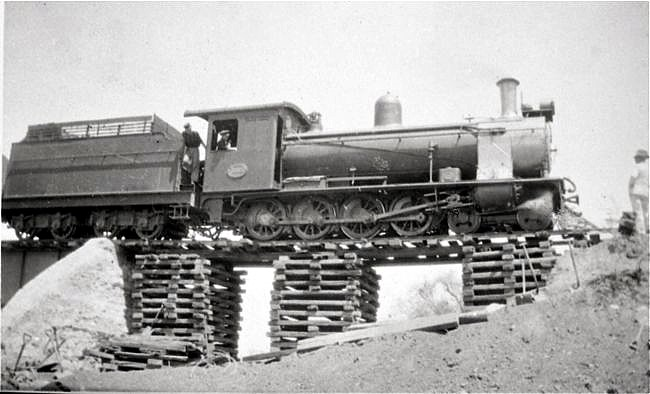
IMR 7th Class

=== Railway lines opened ===
- 25 July – Natal – New Hanover to Greytown, 35 miles 34 chains (57.0 kilometres).
- 8 August – Natal – Park Rynie to Umzinto, 10 miles 40 chains (16.9 kilometres).
- 8 August – Natal – Kelso Junction to Mtwalume, 11 miles 54 chains (18.8 kilometres).
- 5 December – Cape Eastern – Bowker's Park to Tarkastad, 32 miles 47 chains (52.4 kilometres).

=== Locomotives ===
Cape

- Two redesigned 6th Class 4-6-0 steam locomotives are placed in service by the Cape Government Railways. In 1912 they would be designated Class 6F on the South African Railways.
- Four 2-6-0 tank locomotives that are destined for the Nederlandsche-Zuid-Afrikaansche Spoorweg-Maatschappij are intercepted by the Imperial Military Railways (IMR) and diverted to Indwe Collieries. After the war they would be designated 3rd Class on the Cape Government Railways.
- The Port Elizabeth Harbour Board places two 2-6-0 Mogul saddle-tank locomotives in shunting service at the Port Elizabeth Harbour.
- The first of six Scotia Class 0-6-2 tender locomotives enters service with the Cape Copper Company on its 2 ft 6 in (762 mm) gauge Namaqualand Railway between Port Nolloth and O'okiep.

Transvaal

- Two new Cape gauge locomotive types enter service on the Imperial Military Railways (IMR):
  - Due to a shortage of locomotives, six tank locomotives destined for the Western Australian Government Railways are diverted to South Africa, where they become known as the Western Australians.
  - Twenty-five Cape 7th Class locomotives are purchased and three more that were intended for the Pretoria-Pietersburg Railway are commandeered by the Imperial Military Railways.
- The British War Office places two Sirdar class 0-4-0T narrow gauge tank steam locomotives in service near Germiston. In 1912 they would become Class NG1 on the South African Railways.
