= South African Class 6K 4-6-0 =

1901 design of steam locomotive

CGR 6th Class 4-6-0 1901 Baldwin South African Class 6K 4-6-0
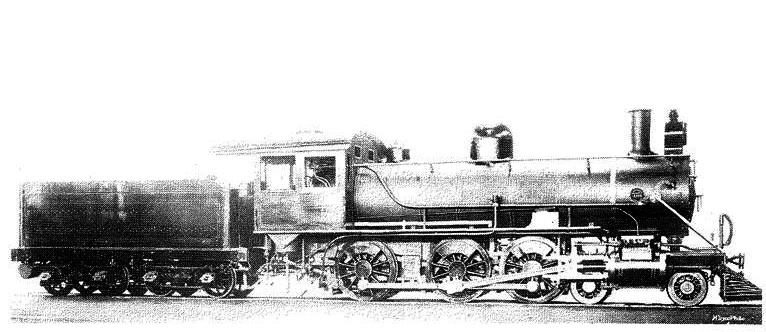
- Ex CGR 6th Class, SAR Class 6K
Type and origin
- Power type: Steam
- Designer: Cape Government Railways; Baldwin Locomotive Works
- Builder: Baldwin Locomotive Works
- Serial number: 18319-18322, 18348-18353
- Model: CGR 6th Class
- Build date: 1901
- Total produced: 10
Specifications
- Configuration
  - Whyte: 4-6-0 (Tenwheeler)
  - UIC: 2'Cn2
- Driver: 2nd coupled axle
- Gauge: 3 ft 6 in (1,067 mm) Cape gauge
- Leading dia.: 28 1/2 in (724 mm)
- Coupled dia.: 54 in (1,372 mm)
- Tender wheels: 33 in (838 mm)
- Wheelbase: 50 ft 1 in (15,265 mm)
  - Axle spacing (Asymmetrical): 1-2: 5 ft (1,524 mm); 2-3: 6 ft 8 in (2,032 mm)
  - Engine: 21 ft 4 in (6,502 mm)
  - Leading: 6 ft (1,829 mm)
  - Coupled: 11 ft 8 in (3,556 mm)
  - Tender: 13 ft 8 in (4,166 mm)
  - Tender bogie: 4 ft 8 in (1,422 mm)
- Length
  - Over couplers: 57 ft 6 1/4 in (17,532 mm)
- Height: 12 ft 6 in (3,810 mm)
- Frame type: Bar
- Axle load: 13 LT 13 cwt (13,870 kg)
  - Leading: 9 LT (9,144 kg)
  - 1st coupled: 12 LT 13 cwt (12,850 kg)
  - 2nd coupled: 13 LT 13 cwt (13,870 kg)
  - 3rd coupled: 12 LT 18 cwt (13,110 kg)
  - Tender bogie: Bogie 1: 15 LT 4 cwt (15,440 kg); Bogie 2: 17 LT 8 cwt (17,680 kg)
- Adhesive weight: 39 LT 4 cwt (39,830 kg)
- Loco weight: 48 LT 4 cwt (48,970 kg)
- Tender weight: 32 LT 12 cwt (33,120 kg)
- Total weight: 80 LT 16 cwt (82,100 kg)
- Tender type: 2-axle bogies
- Fuel type: Coal
- Fuel capacity: 5 LT (5.1 t)
- Water cap.: 3,360 imp gal (15,300 L)
- Firebox
  - Type: Round-top
  - Grate area: 19 sq ft (1.8 m^{2})
- Boiler
  - Pitch: 6 ft 11 in (2,108 mm)
  - Diameter: 4 ft 10 3/4 in (1,492 mm)
  - Tube plates: 11 ft 10 5/8 in (3,623 mm)
  - Small tubes: 182: 2 in (51 mm)
- Boiler pressure: 180 psi (1,241 kPa)
- Safety valve: Pop
- Heating surface
  - Firebox: 113 sq ft (10.5 m^{2})
  - Tubes: 1,195 sq ft (111.0 m^{2})
  - Total surface: 1,308 sq ft (121.5 m^{2})
- Cylinders: Two
- Cylinder size: 17 1/2 in (444 mm) bore 26 in (660 mm) stroke
- Valve gear: Stephenson
- Couplers: Johnston link-and-pin
Performance figures
- Tractive effort: 19,910 lbf (88.6 kN) @ 75%
Career
- Operators: Cape Government Railways; South African Railways
- Class: CGR 6th Class, SAR Class 6K
- Number in class: 10
- Numbers: CGR 301-305, 795-799; SAR 649-658
- Delivered: 1901
- First run: 1901
- Withdrawn: 1928
- The 2nd coupled axle had flangeless wheels

The South African Railways Class 6K 4-6-0 of 1901 was a steam locomotive from the pre-Union era in the Cape of Good Hope.

In 1901, ten American-built 6th Class bar-framed steam locomotives with a 4-6-0 wheel arrangement were placed in service by the Cape Government Railways. In 1912, when they were assimilated into the South African Railways, they were renumbered and designated Class 6K.

== Manufacturer ==
The original Cape 6th Class locomotive was designed at the Salt River works of the Cape Government Railways (CGR) at the same time as the 7th Class.

Three new versions of the 6th Class locomotive entered service on the CGR in 1901, two American-built and one British-built. Of the two American-built versions, one was designed and built by Baldwin Locomotive Works to the specifications of the CGR locomotive department. These ten engines were consequently somewhat different in appearance from most previous Cape 6th Class locomotives.

== Characteristics ==
They were larger than any of the previous 6th Class locomotives. Like the Schenectady-built Class 6G, they had larger boilers, large cabs and 17 1/2 inches (444 millimetres) bore cylinders, compared to the 17 inches (432 millimetres) bore cylinders of all the British-built 6th Class locomotives. They had bar frames, stovepipe chimneys and large domes and were the only 6th Class locomotives which were not delivered with Ramsbottom safety valves, having been equipped with the Pop type.

Apart from the stovepipe chimney, a visually obvious distinction was their coupled wheel counterweights, which were shaped like bent rectangles, instead of the usual curved and tapered counterweights which were used on most South African locomotives. Like other second generation 6th Class locomotives, they had higher running boards without driving wheel fairings. They were numbered in the range from 301 to 305 for the CGR's Western System and in the range from 795 to 799 for the Eastern System.

== Class 6 sub-classes ==
When the Union of South Africa was established on 31 May 1910, the three Colonial government railways (CGR, Natal Government Railways and Central South African Railways) were united under a single administration to control and administer the railways, ports and harbours of the Union. Although the South African Railways and Harbours came into existence in 1910, the actual classification and renumbering of all the rolling stock of the three constituent railways were only implemented with effect from 1 January 1912.

When these ten locomotives were assimilated into the South African Railways (SAR) in 1912, they were renumbered in the range from 649 to 658 and designated Class 6K.

The rest of the CGR's 6th Class locomotives, together with the Central South African Railways (CSAR) Classes 6-L1 to 6-L3 locomotives which had been inherited from the Oranje-Vrijstaat Gouwerment-Spoorwegen (OVGS) via the Imperial Military Railways (IMR), were grouped into thirteen more sub-classes by the SAR. The 4-6-0 locomotives became SAR Classes 6, 6A to 6H, 6J and 6L, the 2-6-2 locomotives became Class 6Y and the 2-6-4 locomotives became Class 6Z.

== Service ==
The Class 6 family of locomotives were introduced primarily as passenger locomotives, but when the class became displaced by larger and more powerful locomotive classes, it literally became a Jack-of-all-trades. It went on to see service in all parts of the country, except Natal, and was used on all types of traffic.

In SAR service, the Class 6K locomotives worked on the East London mainline until they were withdrawn by 1928.

== Renumbering ==
The Class 6K engine number sequence does not correspond with its builder's works number sequence. The table lists the Class 6K works numbers, CGR engine numbers and SAR renumbering.

Class 6K 4-6-0 Works no's & renumbering
Works no.	CGR no.	CGR Sys.	SAR no.
18319	301	Western	649
18320	302	Western	650
18321	303	Western	651
18352	304	Western	652
18353	305	Western	653
18351	795	Eastern	654
18322	796	Eastern	655
18349	797	Eastern	656
18348	798	Eastern	657
18350	799	Eastern	658
