= South African Class 8R 4-8-0 =

1901 design of steam locomotive

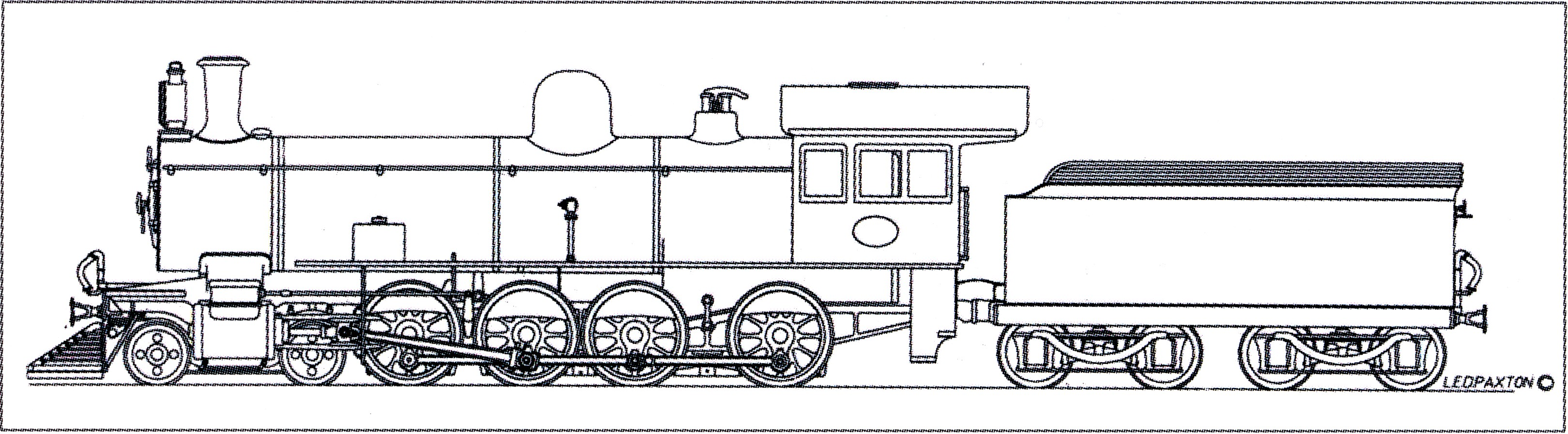
- Drawing of Class 8R no. 883
Type and origin
- Power type: Steam
- Designer: Cape Government Railways (H.M. Beatty)
- Builder: American Locomotive Company
- Serial number: ALCO 25454
- Model: CGR 8th Class (2-8-0)
- Build date: 1902
- Total produced: 16
- Rebuilder: South African Railways
- Rebuild date: 1930
- Number rebuilt: 1
Specifications
- Configuration
  - Whyte: 4-8-0 (Mastodon)
  - UIC: 2'Dh2
- Driver: 2nd coupled axle
- Gauge: 3 ft 6 in (1,067 mm) Cape gauge
- Leading dia.: 28 1/2 in (724 mm)
- Coupled dia.: 48 in (1,219 mm)
- Tender wheels: 33 1/2 in (851 mm) as built 34 in (864 mm) retyred
- Wheelbase
  - Axle spacing (Asymmetrical): 1-2: 4 ft 7 in (1,397 mm); 2-3: 4 ft 3 in (1,295 mm); 3-4: 5 ft 8 in (1,727 mm)
  - Coupled: 14 ft 6 in (4,420 mm)
  - Tender: 14 ft 5 in (4,394 mm)
  - Tender bogie: 5 ft (1,524 mm)
- Frame type: Bar
- Axle load
  - Tender axle: 9 LT 3 cwt 3 qtr (9,335 kg) average
- Tender weight: 36 LT 15 cwt (37,340 kg)
- Tender type: WG (2-axle bogies); WE, WG permitted
- Fuel type: Coal
- Fuel capacity: 6 LT (6.1 t)
- Water cap.: 3,080 imp gal (14,000 L)
- Firebox
  - Type: Round-top
- Boiler
  - Tube plates: 15 ft 2 1/2 in (4,636 mm)
- Safety valve: Ramsbottom
- Heating surface: 1,318 sq ft (122.4 m^{2})
- Cylinders: Two
- Cylinder size: 18 1/2 in (470 mm) bore 24 in (610 mm) stroke
- Valve gear: Stephenson
- Valve type: Piston
- Loco brake: Steam brake
- Train brakes: Vacuum brake on tender
- Couplers: AAR knuckle
Career
- Operators: South African Railways
- Class: Class 8R
- Number in class: 1
- Numbers: 883
- Delivered: 1930
- First run: 1930
- Withdrawn: 1939

The South African Railways Class 8R 4-8-0 of 1930 was a steam locomotive.

In 1901 and 1902, the Cape Government Railways placed sixteen 8th Class 2-8-0 Consolidation type steam locomotives in service. In 1912, when they were assimilated into the South African Railways, they were renumbered and reclassified to Class 8X. One of them was reboilered and converted to a 4-8-0 Mastodon type wheel arrangement in 1930 and reclassified to Class 8R.

== Manufacturers ==
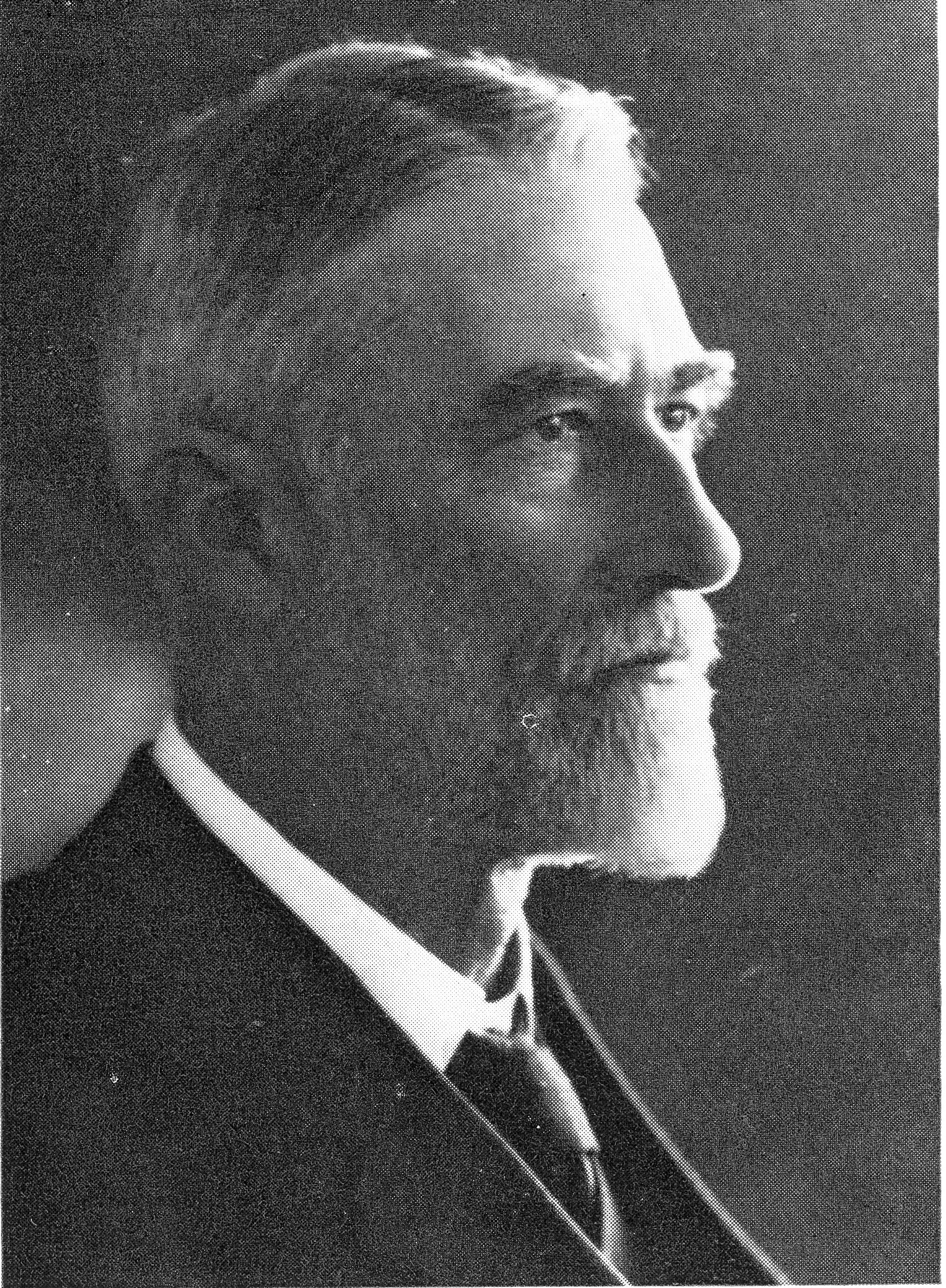
H.M. Beatty

The first 8th Class 2-8-0 Consolidation type locomotive of the Cape Government Railways (CGR) was designed by H.M. Beatty, the Chief Locomotive Superintendent of the CGR from 1896 to 1910. Fourteen of these engines were built by the American Locomotive Company (ALCO) in 1902.

They were conceived as mixed traffic locomotives, equally suitable for goods and passenger work, and had bar frames, narrow fireboxes, used saturated steam and had cylinders with overhead slide valves which were actuated by inside Stephenson valve gear. The Type WG bogie tender entered service with these engines.

== South African Railways ==
When the Union of South Africa was established on 31 May 1910, the three Colonial government railways (CGR, Natal Government Railways and Central South African Railways) were united under a single administration to control and administer the railways, ports and harbours of the Union. Although the South African Railways and Harbours came into existence in 1910, the actual classification and renumbering of all the rolling stock of the three constituent railways were only implemented with effect from 1 January 1912. In 1912, these Consolidation types were designated Class 8X on the South African Railways (SAR).

== Wheel arrangement modification ==
In 1930, one of the Class 8X locomotives, SAR no. 883, was reboilered with a purpose-built boiler by SAR Chief Mechanical Engineer A.G. Watson. At the same time, it was equipped with superheating and piston-valve cylinders. The locomotive was converted to a 4-8-0 Mastodon type wheel arrangement by replacing the leading pony truck with a bogie in a belated attempt to rectify one of the shortcomings of the original Class 8 2-8-0 locomotive. To accommodate the four-wheeled bogie, the front of the bar frame was apparently modified to reposition the cylinders.

The modified no. 883 was reclassified and became the sole Class 8R locomotive. No other such conversions were done, since the Class 8 family had already begun to be displaced by newer and more powerful locomotives and many would be withdrawn from service by the late 1930s.

== Service ==
Class 8R no. 883 was put to work in the Eastern Transvaal. Even though some did not consider the rebuilding a success, the engine remained in service for nine years until it was withdrawn from service in 1939.
