= South African type WE tender =

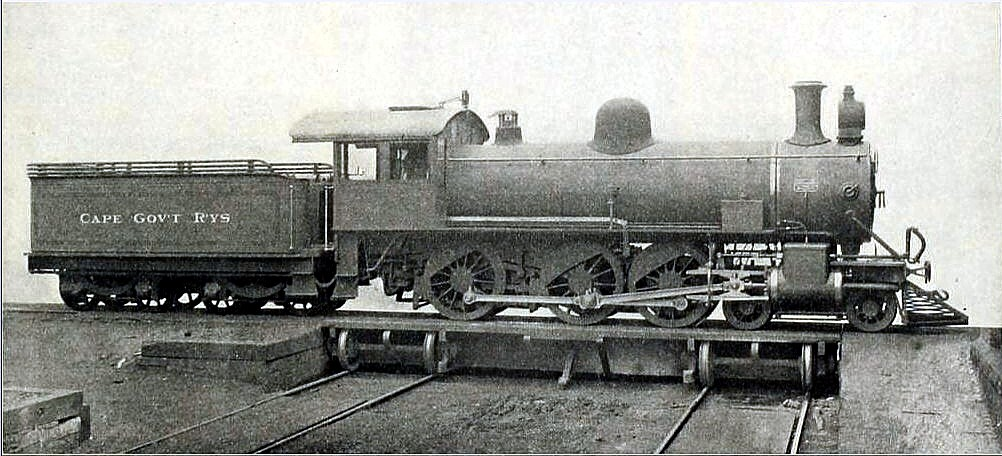
- Type WE tender on CGR 6th Class of 1901 (Schenectady)
Type and origin
- Locomotive: CGR 6th Class of 1901 (Schenectady)
- Designer: Cape Government Railways; Schenectady Locomotive Works
- Builder: Schenectady Locomotive Works
- In service: 1901
Specifications
- Configuration: 2-axle bogies
- Gauge: 3 ft 6 in (1,067 mm) Cape gauge
- Length: 20 ft 4 11/16 in (6,215 mm)
- Wheel dia.: 33 1/2 in (851 mm) as built 34 in (864 mm) retyred
- Wheelbase: 14 ft 5 in (4,394 mm)
  - Bogie: 5 ft (1,524 mm)
- Axle load: 8 LT 13 cwt (8,789 kg)
  - Front bogie: 15 LT 16 cwt (16,050 kg)
  - Rear bogie: 17 LT 6 cwt (17,580 kg)
- Weight empty: 34,944 lb (15,850 kg)
- Weight w/o: 33 LT 2 cwt (33,630 kg)
- Fuel type: Coal
- Fuel cap.: 5 LT (5.1 t)
- Water cap.: 2,800 imp gal (12,700 L)
- Stoking: Manual
- Couplers: Drawbar & Johnston link-and-pin
Career
- Operators: Cape Government Railways; South African Railways
- Numbers: SAR 606-613

The South African type WE tender was a steam locomotive tender from the pre-Union era in the Cape of Good Hope.

Type WE tenders entered service in 1901, as tenders to the 6th Class 4-6-0 Tenwheeler type steam locomotives which were acquired by the Cape Government Railways from Schenectady Locomotive Works in that year. These locomotives were designated Class 6G on the South African Railways in 1912.

== Manufacturer ==
Type WE tenders were built by Schenectady Locomotive Works in 1901.

The Cape Government Railways (CGR) placed eight redesigned 4-6-0 Tenwheeler type steam locomotives in service in 1901, designed and built by the Schenectady Locomotive Works to the specifications of the CGR locomotive department. These locomotives were designated Class 6G on the South African Railways (SAR) in 1912. The Type WE entered service as tenders to these engines.

== Characteristics ==
The tender had a coal capacity of 5 long tons (5.1 tonnes), a water capacity of 2,800 imperial gallons (12,700 litres; 3,360 US gallons) and a maximum axle load of 8 long tons 13 hundredweight (8,789 kilograms).

== Locomotive ==
In the SAR years, tenders were numbered for the engines they were delivered with. In most cases, an oval number plate, bearing the engine number and often also the tender type, would be attached to the rear end of the tender. During the classification and renumbering of locomotives onto the SAR roster in 1912, no separate classification and renumbering list was published for tenders, which should have been renumbered according to the locomotive renumbering list.

Only the Schenectady-built Class 6G locomotives were delivered new with Type WE tenders, renumbered in the SAR number range from 606 to 613.

== Classification letters ==
Since many tender types are interchangeable between different locomotive classes and types, a tender classification system was adopted by the SAR. The first letter of the tender type indicates the classes of engines to which it can be coupled. The "W_" tenders could be used with the locomotive classes as shown, although in some cases, such as with Class 6G locomotives, the drawbar and safety chains had to be altered to suit the target engine.

- CGR 6th Class of 1901 (Schenectady), SAR Class 6G.
- SAR Class 8R.
- CGR 8th Class 2-8-0 of 1901, SAR Class 8X.

The second letter indicates the tender's water capacity. The "_E" tenders had a capacity of between 2,800 and 2,855 imperial gallons (12,700 and 13,000 litres; 3,360 and 3,430 US gallons).
