= South African type WG tender =

Steam locomotive tender in South Africa

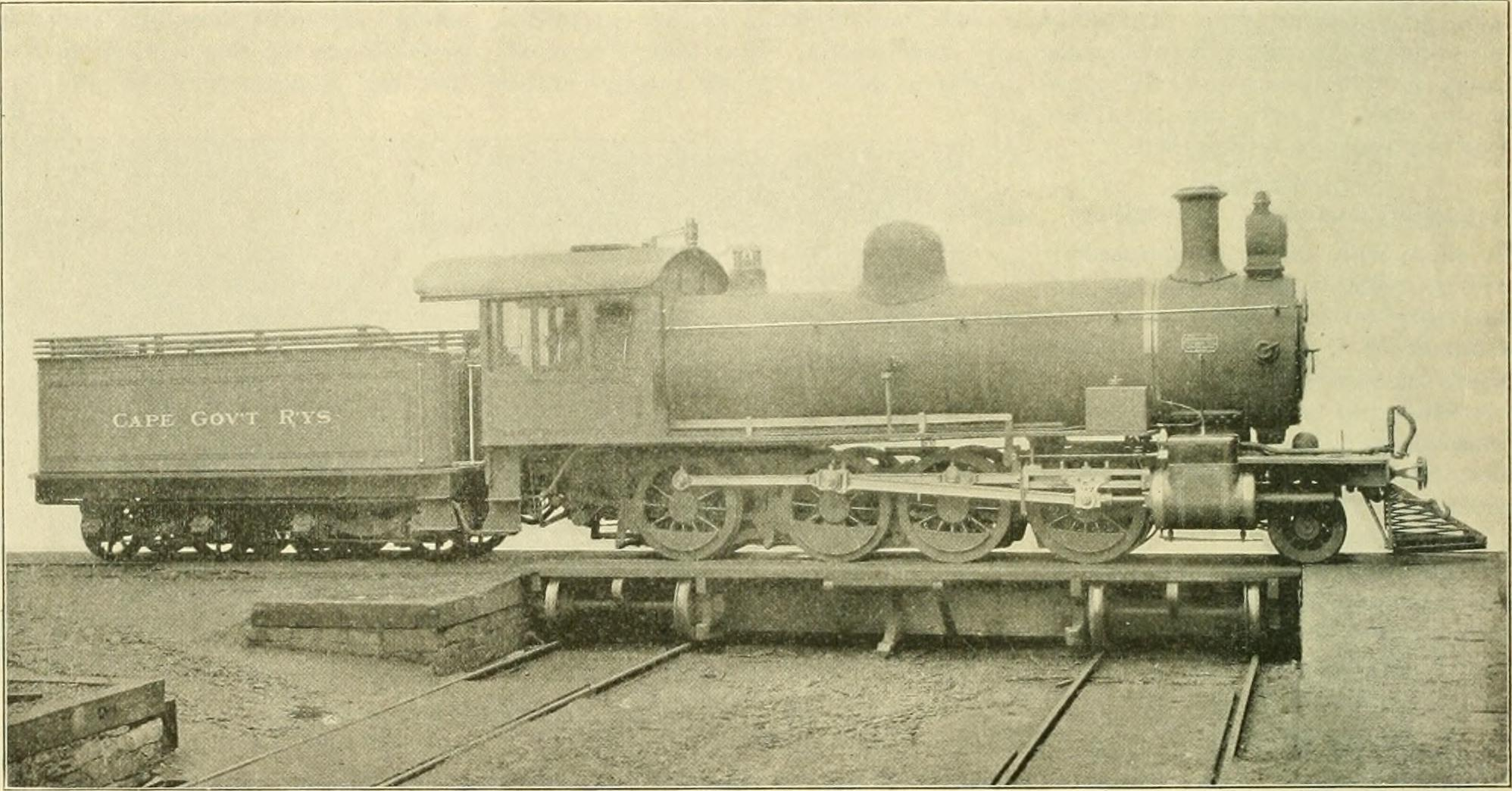
- Type WG tender on CGR 8th Class of 1901
Type and origin
- Locomotive: CGR 8th Class of 1901
- Designer: Cape Government Railways (H.M. Beatty)
- Builder: Schenectady Locomotive Works; American Locomotive Company
- In service: 1901-1902
Specifications
- Configuration: 2-axle bogies
- Gauge: 3 ft 6 in (1,067 mm) Cape gauge
- Length: 20 ft 3 1/2 in (6,185 mm)
- Wheel dia.: 33 1/2 in (851 mm) as built 34 in (864 mm) retyred
- Wheelbase: 14 ft 5 in (4,394 mm)
  - Bogie: 5 ft (1,524 mm)
- Axle load: 9 LT 3 cwt 3 qtr (9,335 kg) average
- Weight empty: 38,080 lb (17,270 kg)
- Weight w/o: 36 LT 15 cwt (37,340 kg)
- Fuel type: Coal
- Fuel cap.: 6 LT (6.1 t)
- Water cap.: 3,080 imp gal (14,000 L)
- Stoking: Manual
- Couplers: Drawbar & Johnston link-and-pin
Career
- Operators: Cape Government Railways; South African Railways
- Numbers: SAR 880-895

The South African type WG tender was a steam locomotive tender from the pre-Union era in the Cape of Good Hope.

Type WG tenders first entered service in 1901, as tenders to the 8th Class 2-8-0 Consolidation type steam locomotives which were acquired by the Cape Government Railways in 1901 and 1902. These locomotives were designated Class 8X on the South African Railways in 1912.

== Manufacturers ==
Type WG tenders were built by Schenectady Locomotive Works and American Locomotive Company (ALCO) in 1901 and 1902. In 1901, while they were being built, Schenectady merged with seven other American locomotive builders to form ALCO.

The Cape Government Railways (CGR) placed sixteen 2-8-0 Consolidation type steam locomotives in service in 1901 and 1902, designed by H.M. Beatty, the CGR Chief Locomotive Superintendent, and built by Schenectady and ALCO. These locomotives were designated Class 8X on the South African Railways (SAR) in 1912. The Type WG entered service as tenders to these engines.

== Characteristics ==
The Type WG tender had a coal capacity of 6 long tons (6.1 tonnes), a water capacity of 3,080 imperial gallons (14,000 litres; 3,700 US gallons) and an average maximum axle loading of 9 long tons 3 hundredweight 3 quarters (9,335 kilograms).

== Locomotives ==
In the SAR years, tenders were numbered for the engines they were delivered with. In most cases, an oval number plate, bearing the engine number and often also the tender type, would be attached to the rear end of the tender. During the classification and renumbering of locomotives onto the SAR roster in 1912, no separate classification and renumbering list was published for tenders, which should have been renumbered according to the locomotive renumbering list.

Only Class 8X locomotives were delivered new with Type WG tenders, renumbered in the SAR number range from 880 to 895. In 1930, engine no. 883 was reboilered and rebuilt to a 4-8-0 Mastodon type wheel arrangement and reclassified to the sole Class 8R.

== Classification letters ==
Since many tender types are interchangeable between different locomotive classes and types, a tender classification system was adopted by the SAR. The first letter of the tender type indicates the classes of engines to which it can be coupled. The "W_" tenders could be used with the locomotive classes as shown, although in some cases, such as with Class 6G locomotives, the drawbar and safety chains had to be altered to suit the target engine.

- CGR 6th Class of 1901 (Schenectady), SAR Class 6G.
- SAR Class 8R.
- CGR 8th Class of 1901, SAR Class 8X.

The second letter indicates the tender's water capacity. The "_G" tenders had a capacity of 3,080 imperial gallons (14,000 litres; 3,700 US gallons).

A number, when added after the letter code, usually indicates differences between similar tender types, such as function, wheelbase or coal bunker capacity.

== Modification ==
The original slatted upper sides of the Type WG tender's coal bunker were soon extended higher or replaced by sheet-metal sides.

== Illustration ==
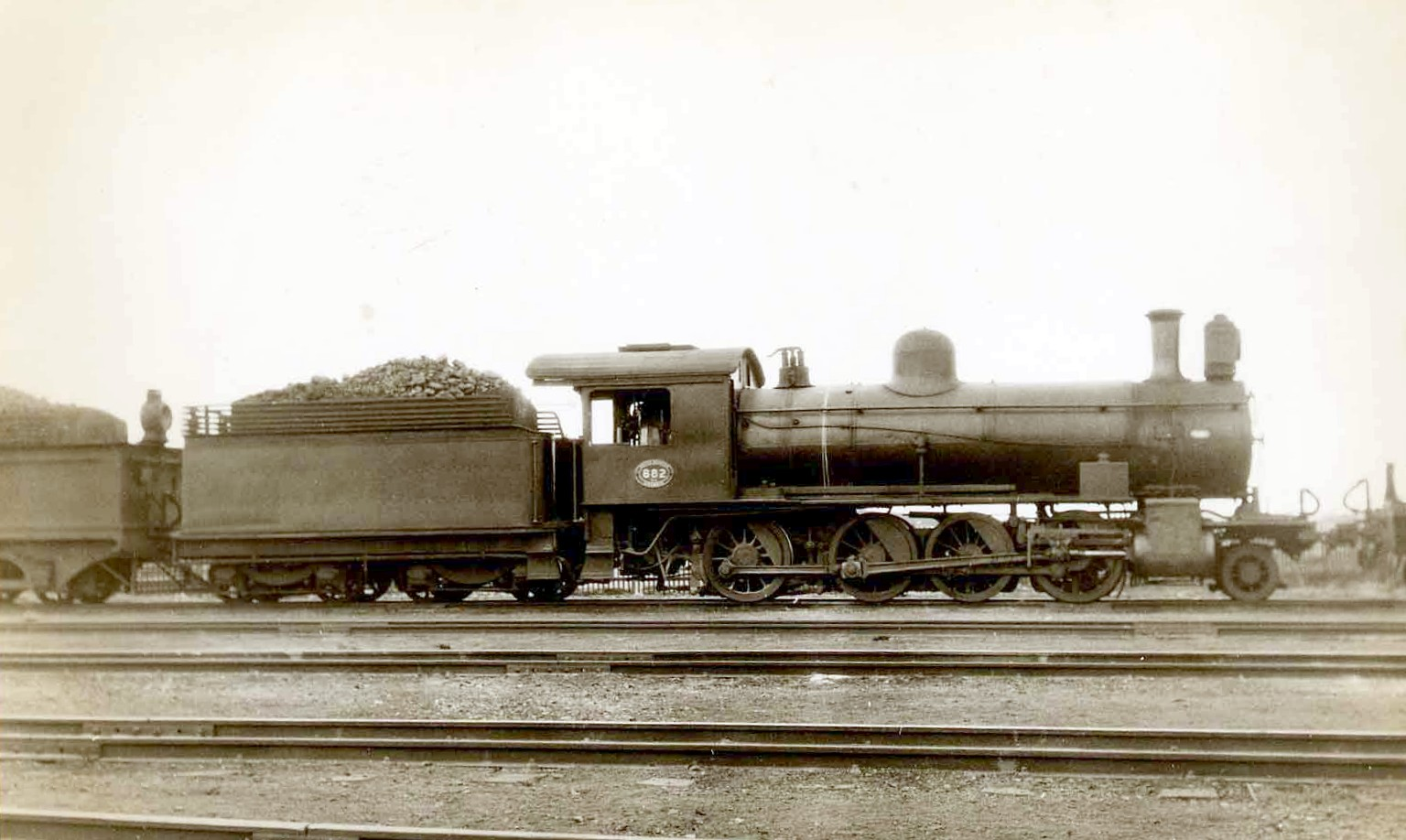
Type WG tender on SAR Class 8X, c. 1930
