= South African Class 6G 4-6-0 =

1901 design of steam locomotive

CGR 6th Class 4-6-0 1901 Schenectady South African Class 6G 4-6-0
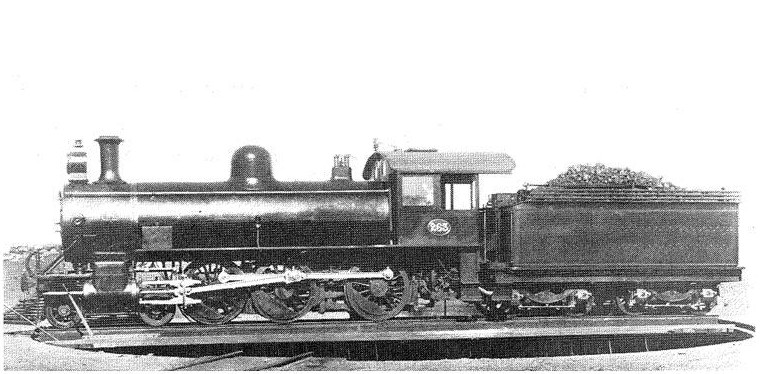
- Ex CGR 6th Class no. 263, SAR Class 6G no. 607
Type and origin
- Power type: Steam
- Designer: Cape Government Railways; Schenectady Locomotive Works
- Builder: Schenectady Locomotive Works
- Serial number: 5646–5653
- Model: CGR 6th Class
- Build date: 1901
- Total produced: 8
Specifications
- Configuration
  - Whyte: 4-6-0 (Tenwheeler)
  - UIC: 2'Cn2
- Driver: 2nd coupled axle
- Gauge: 3 ft 6 in (1,067 mm) Cape gauge
- Leading dia.: 28 1/2 in (724 mm)
- Coupled dia.: 54 in (1,372 mm)
- Tender wheels: 33 1/2 in (851 mm) as built 34 in (864 mm) retyred
- Wheelbase: 44 ft 11 3/4 in (13,710 mm)
  - Axle spacing (Asymmetrical): 1-2: 4 ft 9 in (1,448 mm); 2-3: 6 ft 7 in (2,007 mm)
  - Engine: 21 ft 2 in (6,452 mm)
  - Leading: 6 ft (1,829 mm)
  - Coupled: 11 ft 4 in (3,454 mm)
  - Tender: 14 ft 5 in (4,394 mm)
  - Tender bogie: 5 ft (1,524 mm)
- Length
  - Over couplers: 51 ft 5 3/4 in (15,691 mm)
- Height: 12 ft 8 in (3,861 mm)
- Frame type: Bar
- Axle load: 12 LT 15 cwt (12,950 kg)
  - Leading: 12 LT (12,190 kg)
  - 1st coupled: 11 LT 9 cwt 2 qtr (11,660 kg)
  - 2nd coupled: 12 LT 15 cwt (12,950 kg)
  - 3rd coupled: 12 LT 6 cwt (12,500 kg)
  - Tender bogie: Bogie 1: 15 LT 16 cwt (16,050 kg); Bogie 2: 17 LT 6 cwt (17,580 kg)
  - Tender axle: 8 LT 13 cwt (8,789 kg)
- Adhesive weight: 36 LT 10 cwt 2 qtr (37,110 kg)
- Loco weight: 48 LT 10 cwt 2 qtr (49,300 kg)
- Tender weight: 33 LT 2 cwt (33,630 kg)
- Total weight: 81 LT 12 cwt 2 qtr (82,930 kg)
- Tender type: WE (2-axle bogies); WE, WG permitted
- Fuel type: Coal
- Fuel capacity: 5 LT (5.1 t)
- Water cap.: 2,800 imp gal (12,700 L)
- Firebox
  - Type: Round-top
  - Grate area: 18.6 sq ft (1.73 m^{2})
- Boiler
  - Pitch: 6 ft 11 in (2,108 mm)
  - Diameter: 4 ft 11 in (1,499 mm)
  - Tube plates: 11 ft 4 3/4 in (3,473 mm)
  - Small tubes: 195: 2 in (51 mm)
- Boiler pressure: 180 psi (1,241 kPa)
- Safety valve: Ramsbottom 3 in (76 mm)
- Heating surface
  - Firebox: 111.5 sq ft (10.36 m^{2})
  - Tubes: 1,155 sq ft (107.3 m^{2})
  - Total surface: 1,266.5 sq ft (117.66 m^{2})
- Cylinders: Two
- Cylinder size: 17 1/2 in (444 mm) bore 26 in (660 mm) stroke
- Valve gear: Stephenson
- Valve type: Richardson balanced slide
- Valve travel: 5 in (127 mm)
- Valve lap: 1 in (25 mm)
- Loco brake: Steam
- Train brakes: Vacuum
- Couplers: Johnston link-and-pin AAR knuckle (1930s)
Performance figures
- Tractive effort: 19,910 lbf (88.6 kN) @ 75%
Career
- Operators: Cape Government Railways; South African Railways
- Class: CGR 6th Class, SAR Class 6G
- Number in class: 8
- Numbers: CGR 262-269; SAR 606-613
- Delivered: 1901
- First run: 1901
- Withdrawn: 1961
- The 2nd coupled axle had flangeless wheels

The South African Railways Class 6G 4-6-0 of 1901 was a steam locomotive from the pre-Union era in the Cape of Good Hope.

In 1901, eight redesigned 6th Class 4-6-0 steam locomotives were placed in service by the Cape Government Railways. In 1912, when they were assimilated into the South African Railways, they were renumbered and designated Class 6G.

== Manufacturer ==
The original Cape 6th Class locomotive was designed at the Salt River works of the Cape Government Railways (CGR) in 1893, at the same time as the 7th Class.

Three new versions of the 6th Class locomotive entered service on the CGR in 1901, two American-built and one British-built. Of the two American-built versions, one was designed and built by the Schenectady Locomotive Works to the specifications of the CGR locomotive department. They were consequently somewhat different in appearance from the earlier Cape 6th Class locomotives. Eight locomotives were built and delivered, numbered in the range from 262 to 269 and allocated to the Western System.

== Characteristics ==
While these engines were also built on bar frames like the previous two 6th Class versions, they were slightly larger, with larger boilers and with 17 1/2 inches (444 millimetres) diameter cylinders compared to the 17 inches (432 millimetres) diameter cylinders of all earlier 6th Class locomotives. Like the two Class 6F locomotives, a visually obvious distinguishing feature was their higher mounted running boards without the need for coupled wheel fairings.

The locomotive was equipped with Richardson balanced slide valves. The boiler barrel and the outside of the firebox were of Coatesville steel. The boiler feed was by two Cape pattern Gresham & Craven's no. 8 injectors, while the engine used Gresham & Craven's patent sanding gear and a Nathan no. 8 double sight feed cylinder lubricator. It had steam brakes on two pairs of coupled wheels, while the Type WE tender was equipped with a vacuum brake for itself and the train. The whistles were one 3 inches (76 millimetres) and one 4 inches (102 millimetres) Star Chime no. 3 types.

The firebox was 95 inches (2,413 millimetres) long, 28 1/2 inches (724 millimetres) wide, 62 1/2 inches (1,588 millimetres) deep in front and 48 1/2 inches (1,232 millimetres) deep at the back. The firebox itself was of copper, with a rocking style firegrate and a hopper-type ash pan.

The smokebox was equipped with openings on its sides near the front, with covers which each had a handle by which it could be opened with a half turn to give direct access to the inside of the smokebox. This was most likely to facilitate cleaning of the spark arrestor screens to overcome clogging without having to open the smokebox door.

== Class 6 sub-classes ==
When the Union of South Africa was established on 31 May 1910, the three Colonial government railways (CGR, Natal Government Railways and Central South African Railways) were united under a single administration to control and administer the railways, ports and harbours of the Union. Although the South African Railways and Harbours came into existence in 1910, the actual classification and renumbering of all the rolling stock of the three constituent railways were only implemented with effect from 1 January 1912.

When these eight locomotives were assimilated into the South African Railways (SAR) in 1912, they were renumbered in the range from 606 to 613 and designated Class 6G.

The rest of the CGR's 6th Class locomotives, together with 6th Class locomotives which had been inherited from the Oranje-Vrijstaat Gouwerment-Spoorwegen (OVGS) via the Imperial Military Railways (IMR) and the Central South African Railways (CSAR), were grouped into thirteen more sub-classes by the SAR. The 4-6-0 locomotives became SAR Classes 6, 6A to 6F, 6H and 6J to 6L, the 2-6-2 locomotives became Class 6Y and the 2-6-4 locomotives became Class 6Z.

== Service ==
The Class 6 series of locomotives were introduced primarily as passenger locomotives, but when the class became displaced by larger and more powerful locomotive classes, it literally became a Jack-of-all-trades. It went on to see service in all parts of the country, except in Natal, and was used on all types of traffic.

The Class 6G remained in service for sixty years, the last one being withdrawn from service at East London in 1961.

== Illustration ==
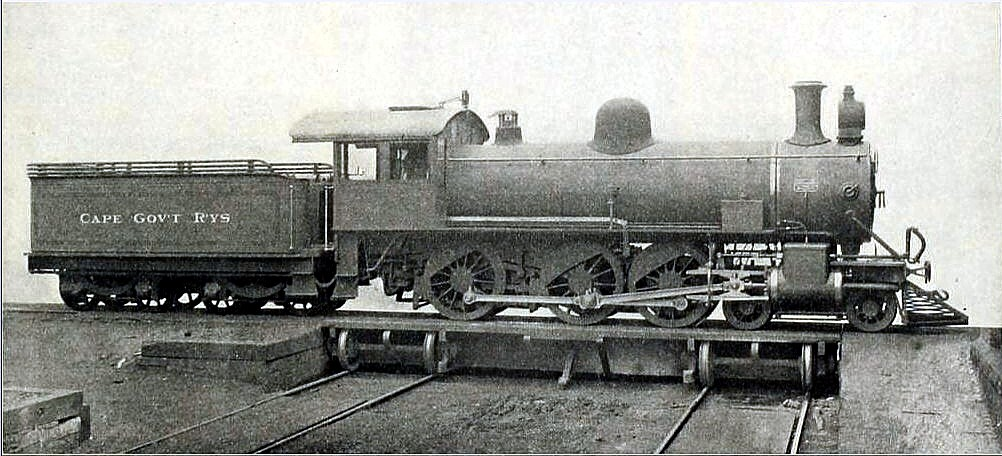
Schenectady works picture of the Class 6G
