= CGR 3rd Class 2-6-0T =

South african steam locomotives

Indwe Collieries 2-6-0T CGR 3rd Class 2-6-0T South African Class 03 2-6-0T
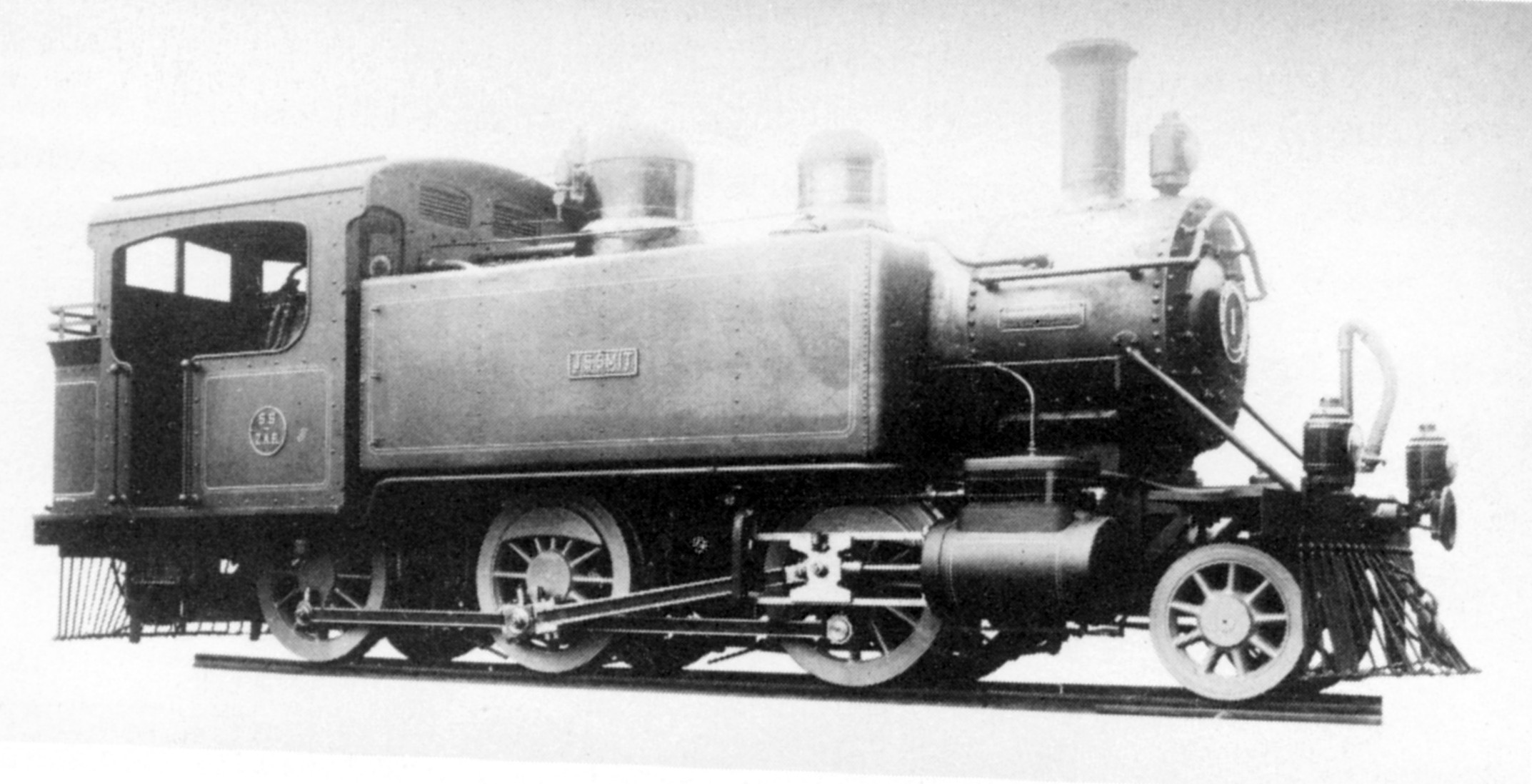
- 3rd Class 2-6-0T no. 50 J.S. Smit, ex Indwe Collieries
Type and origin
- Power type: Steam
- Designer: Dickson Manufacturing Company
- Builder: Dickson Manufacturing Company
- Serial number: 1079–1082
- Build date: 1899
- Total produced: 4
Specifications
- Configuration
  - Whyte: 2-6-0T (Mogul)
  - UIC: 1'Cn2t
- Driver: 2nd coupled axle
- Gauge: 3 ft 6 in (1,067 mm) Cape gauge
- Coupled dia.: 44 in (1,118 mm)
- Fuel type: Coal
- Firebox
  - Type: Round-top
- Cylinders: Two
- Cylinder size: 14 in (356 mm) bore 20 in (508 mm) stroke
- Valve gear: Stephenson
- Couplers: Johnston link-and-pin
Career
- Operators: Indwe Collieries; Cape Government Railways; South African Railways
- Class: CGR 1st Class, SAR Class 01
- Number in class: 4
- Numbers: Indwe 1-4, CGR 50-53, SAR 050-053
- Official name: J.S. Smit, J.J. Spier, L.S. Meyer and C. Birkenstock
- Withdrawn: 1915

The Cape Government Railways 3rd Class 2-6-0T of 1900 was a South African steam locomotive from the pre-Union era in the Cape of Good Hope.

In 1900, during the Second Boer War, four 2-6-0 tank locomotives which were destined for the Nederlandsche-Zuid-Afrikaansche Spoorweg-Maatschappij in the Zuid-Afrikaansche Republiek were intercepted by the Imperial Military Railways and diverted to Indwe Collieries. When the Cape Government Railways took over the operation of the colliery line and the locomotives after the war, they were designated 3rd Class. When the South African Railways was established, they were designated Class 03.

== Manufacturer ==
Before the outbreak of the Second Boer War in October 1899, four tank locomotives were ordered by the Nederlandsche-Zuid-Afrikaansche Spoorweg-Maatschappij (NZASM) in the Zuid-Afrikaansche Republiek (ZAR) from Dickson Manufacturing Company in Scranton, Pennsylvania, through the agency of Arthur Koppel. However, when they were landed in the Cape of Good Hope in 1900, they were commandeered by the Imperial Military Railways (IMR) and allocated to Indwe Collieries.

The locomotives bore plates inscribed "SS ZAR" for Staats-Spoorwegen Zuid-Afrikaansche Republiek and were named J.S. Smit, J.J. Spier, L.S. Meyer and C. Birkenstock, all personalities of note in the ZAR. Indwe Collieries numbered them in the range from 1 to 4.

In 1895, at the time a concession was granted by the ZAR government to Hendrik Jacobus Schoeman for the construction of the Pretoria-Pietersburg Railway, J.S. Smit was the Railway Commissioner of the ZAR.

== Service ==
=== Indwe Collieries ===
Indwe Collieries, which was located in the north-eastern part of the Cape of Good Hope, owned the branch line from Sterkstroom via Dordrecht to the collieries and supplied coal to the Cape Government Railways (CGR). The branch line had been constructed for the collieries by George Pauling in 1896.

=== Cape Government Railways ===
After the war, the colliery line and the locomotives were purchased by the CGR. The locomotives were designated CGR 3rd Class and were renumbered in the range from 50 to 53.

=== South African Railways ===
When the Union of South Africa was established on 31 May 1910, the three Colonial government railways (CGR, Natal Government Railways and Central South African Railways) were united under a single administration to control and administer the railways, ports and harbours of the Union. Although the South African Railways and Harbours came into existence in 1910, the actual classification and renumbering of all the rolling stock of the three constituent railways were only implemented with effect from 1 January 1912.

All four locomotives were still in service in 1912. The South African Railways (SAR) considered them obsolete and they were therefore designated Class 03 and renumbered by having the numeral "0" prefixed to their existing numbers. They were withdrawn from service in 1915.

== Works numbers ==
The works numbers, names and renumbering of the CGR 3rd Class Mogul tank locomotives are shown in the table.

CGR 1st Class 2-6-0T of 1876
| Works no. | Name | Indwe no. | CGR no. | SAR no. |
|---|---|---|---|---|
| 1079 | J.S. Smit | 1 | 50 | 050 |
| 1080 | J.J. Spier | 2 | 51 | 051 |
| 1081 | L.S. Meyer | 3 | 52 | 052 |
| 1082 | C. Birkenstock | 4 | 53 | 053 |
