= South African Class 8X 2-8-0 =

1901 design of steam locomotive

CGR 8th Class 2-8-0 1901 South African Class 8X 2-8-0
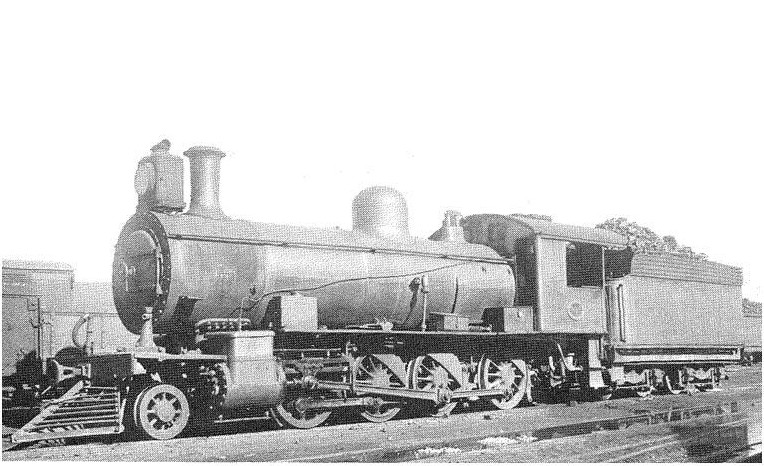
- Ex CGR 8th Class no. 356; SAR Class 8X no. 894
Type and origin
- Power type: Steam
- Designer: Cape Government Railways (H.M. Beatty)
- Builder: Schenectady Locomotive Works; American Locomotive Company
- Serial number: Schenectady 5644-5645; ALCO 25453-25459, 25446-25452
- Model: CGR 8th Class (2-8-0)
- Build date: 1901-1902
- Total produced: 16
- Rebuilder: South African Railways
- Rebuild date: 1930
- Number rebuilt: 1 to 4-8-0 (Mastodon)
Specifications
- Configuration
  - Whyte: 2-8-0 (Consolidation)
  - UIC: 1'Dn2
- Driver: 3rd coupled axle
- Gauge: 3 ft 6 in (1,067 mm) Cape gauge
- Leading dia.: 28 1/2 in (724 mm)
- Coupled dia.: 48 in (1,219 mm)
- Tender wheels: 33 1/2 in (851 mm) as built 34 in (864 mm) retyred
- Wheelbase: 46 ft 1 1/2 in (14,059 mm)
  - Axle spacing (Asymmetrical): 1-2: 4 ft 7 in (1,397 mm); 2-3: 4 ft 3 in (1,295 mm); 3-4: 5 ft 8 in (1,727 mm)
  - Engine: 21 ft 8 in (6,604 mm)
  - Coupled: 14 ft 6 in (4,420 mm)
  - Tender: 14 ft 5 in (4,394 mm)
  - Tender bogie: 5 ft (1,524 mm)
- Length
  - Over couplers: 53 ft 5 1/2 in (16,294 mm)
- Height: 12 ft 10 in (3,912 mm)
- Frame type: Bar
- Axle load: 12 LT 4 cwt (12,400 kg)
  - Leading: 5 LT 19 cwt (6,045 kg)
  - 1st coupled: 9 LT 16 cwt (9,957 kg)
  - 2nd coupled: 11 LT 16 cwt (11,990 kg)
  - 3rd coupled: 11 LT 19 cwt (12,140 kg)
  - 4th coupled: 12 LT 4 cwt (12,400 kg)
  - Tender axle: 9 LT 3 cwt 3 qtr (9,335 kg) average
- Adhesive weight: 45 LT 15 cwt (46,480 kg)
- Loco weight: 51 LT 14 cwt (52,530 kg)
- Tender weight: 36 LT 15 cwt (37,340 kg)
- Total weight: 88 LT 9 cwt (89,870 kg)
- Tender type: WG (2-axle bogies); WE, WG permitted
- Fuel type: Coal
- Fuel capacity: 6 LT (6.1 t)
- Water cap.: 3,080 imp gal (14,000 L)
- Firebox
  - Type: Round-top
  - Grate area: 19.8 sq ft (1.84 m^{2})
- Boiler
  - Pitch: 7 ft 1 in (2,159 mm)
  - Diameter: 4 ft 11 in (1,499 mm)
  - Tube plates: 12 ft 5 5/8 in (3,800 mm)
  - Small tubes: 196: 2 in (51 mm)
- Boiler pressure: 180 psi (1,241 kPa)
- Safety valve: Ramsbottom
- Heating surface
  - Firebox: 128.7 sq ft (11.96 m^{2})
  - Tubes: 1,280.6 sq ft (118.97 m^{2})
  - Total surface: 1,409.3 sq ft (130.93 m^{2})
- Cylinders: Two
- Cylinder size: 18 1/2 in (470 mm) bore 24 in (610 mm) stroke
- Valve gear: Stephenson
- Valve type: Slide
- Loco brake: Steam brake
- Train brakes: Vacuum brake on tender
- Couplers: Johnston link-and-pin AAR knuckle (1930s)
Performance figures
- Tractive effort: 23,110 lbf (102.8 kN) @ 75%
Career
- Operators: Cape Government Railways; South African Railways
- Class: CGR 8th Class (2-8-0); SAR Class 8X (2-8-0)
- Number in class: 16
- Numbers: CGR 749-757, 361-357; SAR 880-895
- Delivered: 1901-1902
- First run: 1901
- Withdrawn: 1937-1950
- The 2nd & 3rd coupled axles had flangeless wheels

The South African Railways Class 8X 2-8-0 of 1901 was a steam locomotive from the pre-Union era in the Cape of Good Hope.

In 1901 and 1902, the Cape Government Railways placed sixteen 8th Class 2-8-0 Consolidation type steam locomotives in service. In 1912, when they were assimilated into the South African Railways, they were renumbered and designated Class 8X.

== Manufacturers ==
The first 8th Class 2-8-0 Consolidation type locomotive of the Cape Government Railways (CGR) was designed by H.M. Beatty, the Chief Locomotive Superintendent of the CGR from 1896 to 1910. Sixteen of these engines were ordered from the Schenectady Locomotive Works in the United States of America. In 1901, while they were being built, Schenectady merged with seven other American locomotive builders to form the American Locomotive Company (ALCO).

As a result, the first two locomotives, numbered 749 and 750, were built by Schenectady in 1901, while ALCO built the rest in 1902. Of the latter, the first seven were numbered in the range from 351 to 357 and were allocated to the Midland System, while the last seven were numbered in the range from 751 to 757 and joined the two Schenectady-builts on the Western System.

== Characteristics ==
They were conceived as mixed traffic locomotives, equally suitable for goods and passenger work, and had bar frames, narrow fireboxes and used saturated steam. The Type WG bogie tender entered service with these engines.

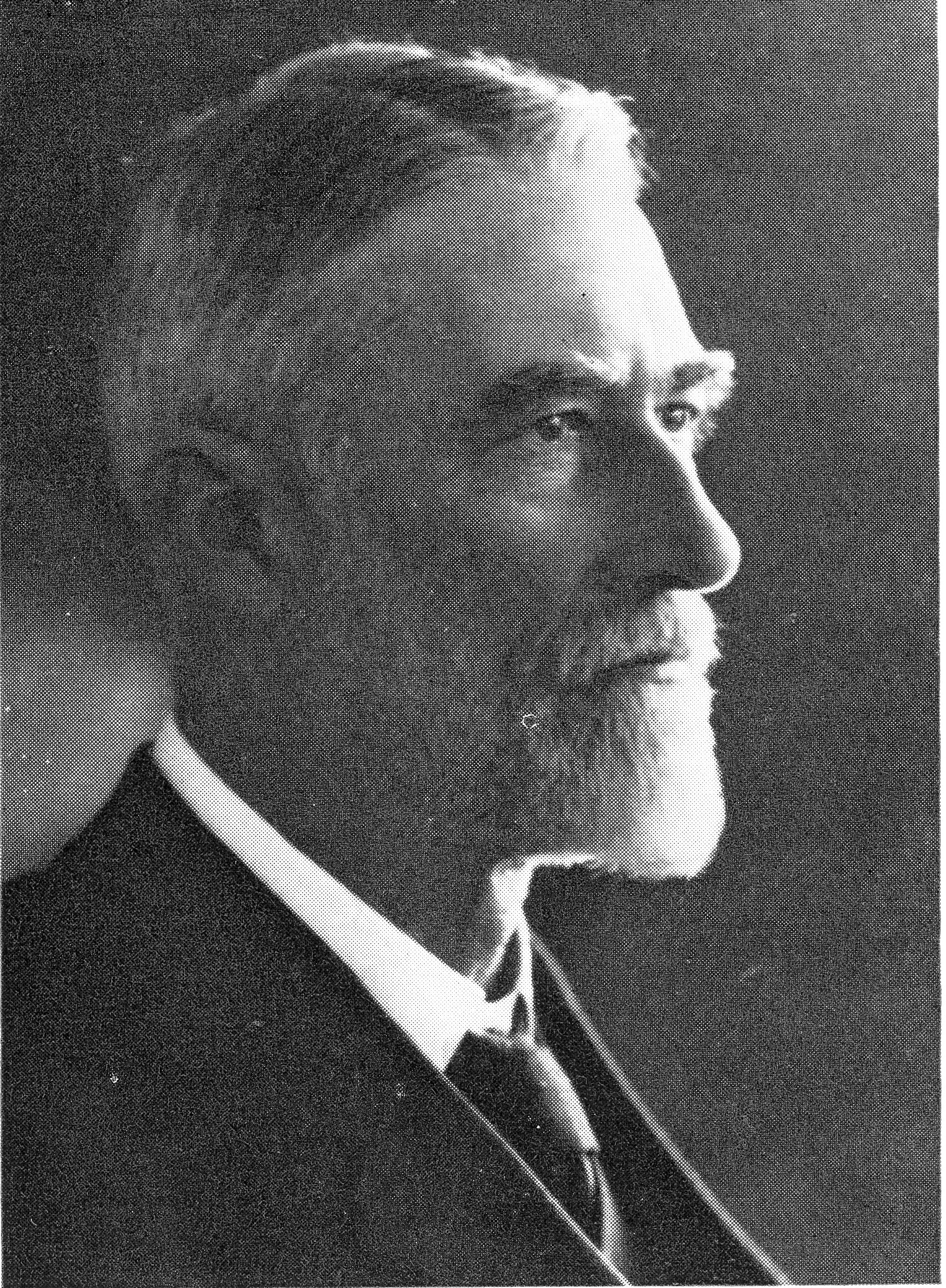
H.M. Beatty

The locomotive had a copper firebox, with a rocking grate with drop plates and a hopper-style ash-pan. The boiler was equipped with 3 inches (76 millimetres) Ramsbottom safety valves, while its feedwater was supplied by two Cape pattern Gresham & Craven's no. 8 injectors. The engine was equipped with a Nathan double-sight feed cylinder lubricator, Gresham & Craven's patent steam sanding gear and one 3 inches (76 millimetres) and one 4 inches (102 millimetres) Star chime no. 3 whistles.

For improved accessibility, the steam chests were mounted outside the frames instead of between them. The slide valves, operated by Stephenson Link motion, were on top of the cylinders and employed rocker shafts. The balance weight for the Stephenson motion was seldom used on American locomotives and was replaced by a powerful coiled spring.

On the 8th Class, the boiler pitch (the height of the boiler's centre-line above rail level) was higher than on earlier CGR locomotives, raised to 7 feet 1 inch (2,159 millimetres). This was done to accommodate the large firebox with its 20.03 square feet (1.861 square metres) firegrate area which had to be installed above instead of between the frames.

A successful smokebox innovation on the 8th Class locomotive was the installation of a petticoat pipe, suspended from the top of the smokebox below the base of the chimney with its bell-shaped bottom end above the blast pipe. Its function was to enhance and equalise the draught through the boiler tubes. The petticoat pipe was new to South Africa. Previously, locomotive builders relied on the length of the chimney to enhance draught, but as boiler sizes increased and chimneys became shorter to remain within loading gauge limitations, the petticoat pipe became vital.

The spark arresters were made from perforated plate, arranged in V-shape and attached to movable wings which were hinged to the blast pipe so that they could be moved aside when the tubes were being cleaned.

The 8th Class proved to be good all-round engines and were found to be remarkably steady, even at high speed. In comparison to the 7th Class, the 8th Class used less coal in proportion to the tonnage hauled, at a consumption per train-mile of 14.1% in excess of that of the 7th Class, but with a 23% greater load.

== Wheel arrangements ==
Between 1902 and 1904, these 2-8-0 locomotives were followed by several more orders, placed with various manufacturers for similar locomotives for the CGR. While subjecting these first sixteen locomotives to exhaustive testing on all types of traffic and under varying conditions, some trouble was experienced with the leading pony truck.

In the designs of all but two of the subsequent orders for more 8th Class locomotives, the two-wheeled pony truck was replaced by a four-wheeled bogie. Most of the later versions of the locomotive were therefore built with a 4-8-0 Mastodon type wheel arrangement. In spite of the difference, they were all grouped together into the 8th Class by the CGR.

== Class 8 sub-classes ==
When the Union of South Africa was established on 31 May 1910, the three Colonial government railways (CGR, Natal Government Railways and Central South African Railways) were united under a single administration to control and administer the railways, ports and harbours of the Union. Although the South African Railways and Harbours came into existence in 1910, the actual classification and renumbering of all the rolling stock of the three constituent railways were only implemented with effect from 1 January 1912.

In 1912, these sixteen Consolidation types were designated Class 8X on the South African Railways (SAR). They, together with the rest of the CGR’s 8th Class 2-8-0 Consolidation types and 8th Class 4-8-0 Mastodon types, plus the Class 8-L1 to 8-L3 4-8-0 Mastodon type locomotives of the CSAR, were grouped into ten different sub-classes on the SAR. The 4-8-0 locomotives became SAR Classes 8 and 8A to 8F while the 2-8-0 locomotives became Classes 8X to 8Z.

== Works numbers ==
The table lists the locomotive builders, works numbers and the CGR and SAR numbering of the Class 8X locomotives.

Class 8X 2-8-0 Builders, Works Numbers & Renumbering
Builders	Year	Works no.	CGR no.	SAR no.
Schenectady	1901	5644	749	880
Schenectady	1901	5645	750	881
ALCO	1902	25446	351	889
ALCO	1902	25447	352	890
ALCO	1902	25448	353	891
ALCO	1902	25449	354	892
ALCO	1902	25450	355	893
ALCO	1902	25451	356	894
ALCO	1902	25452	357	895
ALCO	1902	25453	751	882
ALCO	1902	25454	752	883
ALCO	1902	25455	753	884
ALCO	1902	25456	754	885
ALCO	1902	25457	755	886
ALCO	1902	25458	756	887
ALCO	1902	25459	757	888

== Wheel arrangement modification ==
In 1930, SAR no. 883 was reboilered with a purpose-built boiler and equipped with superheating. At the same time, it was converted to a 4-8-0 Mastodon type wheel arrangement by replacing the leading pony truck with a bogie. The modified locomotive was reclassified and became the sole member of Class 8R.

== Service ==
In SAR service, the Class 8X was employed mainly on the Midland System. The majority of the class were withdrawn by 1937, but no. 894 survived to 1950 before being scrapped. The sole Class 8R 4-8-0 was put to work in the Eastern Transvaal until it was withdrawn from service in 1939.

== Illustration ==
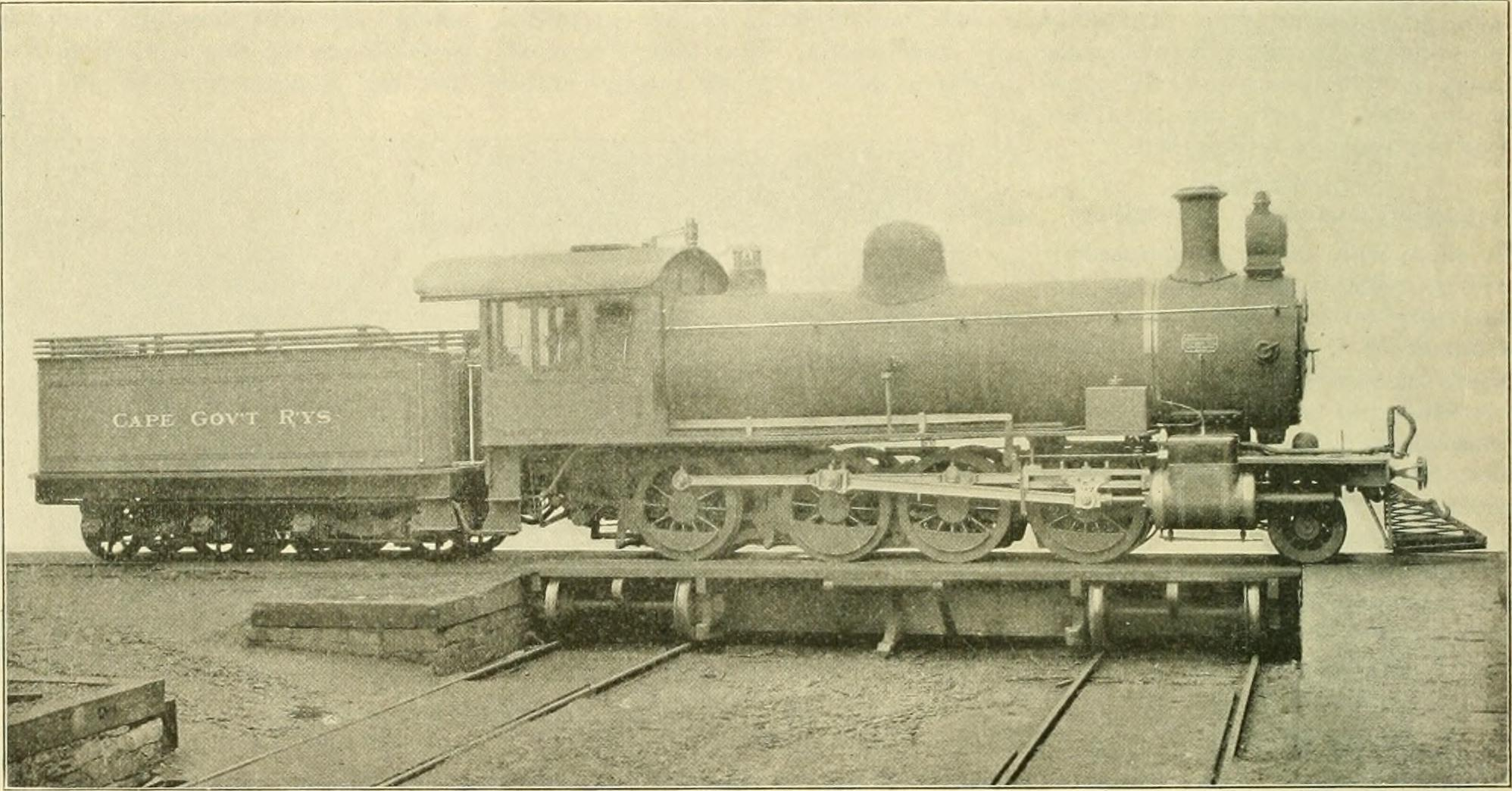
Schenectady works picture of the CGR 8th Class 2-8-0 on a transfer table, 1901

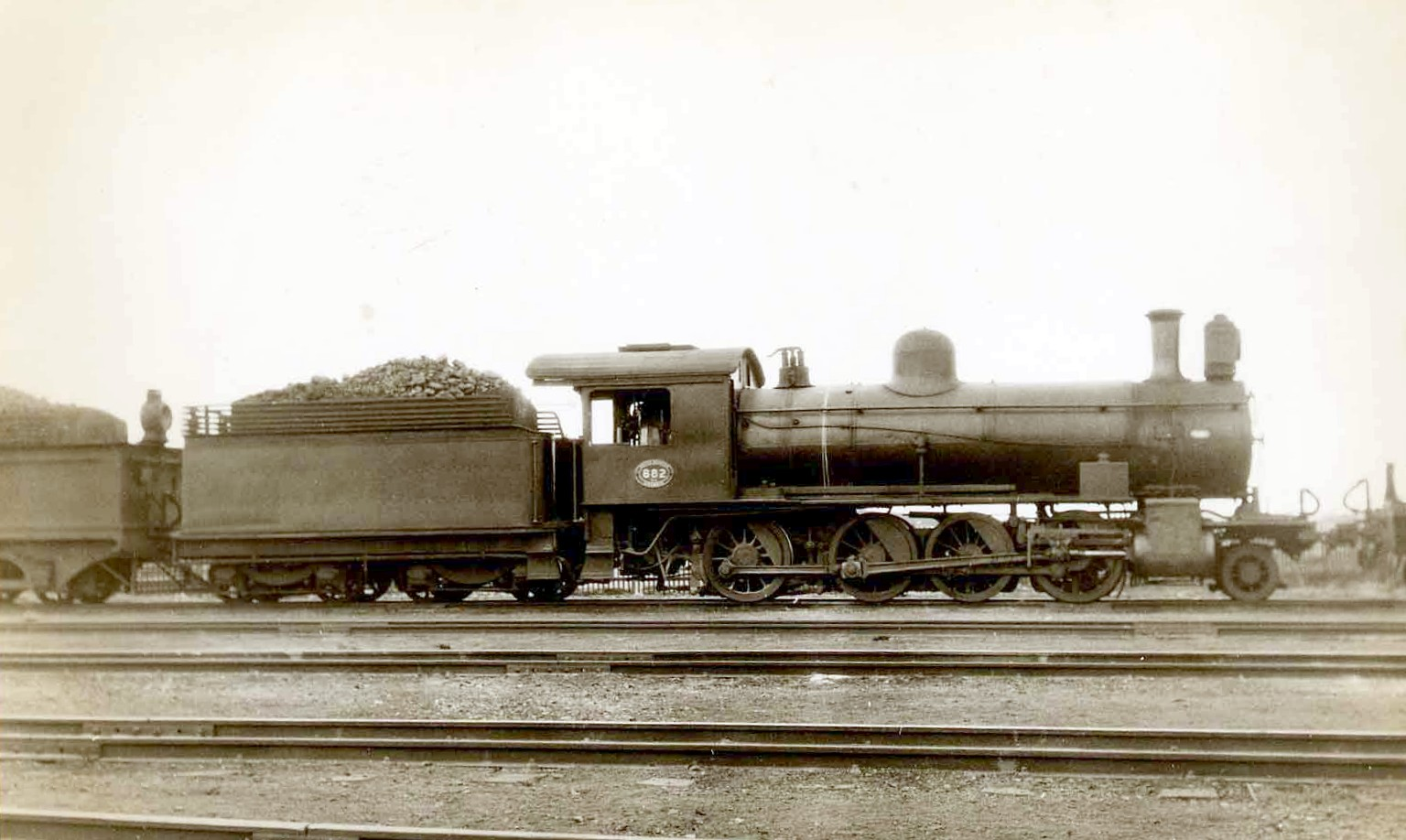
Ex CGR 8th Class 2-8-0 no. 751, reclassified and renumbered to SAR Class 8X no. 882, c. 1930
