= CGR 2-6-0ST 1900 =

Type of steam locomotive

Port Elizabeth Harbour 2-6-0ST 1900 CGR 2-6-0ST 1900 South African 2-6-0ST 1900
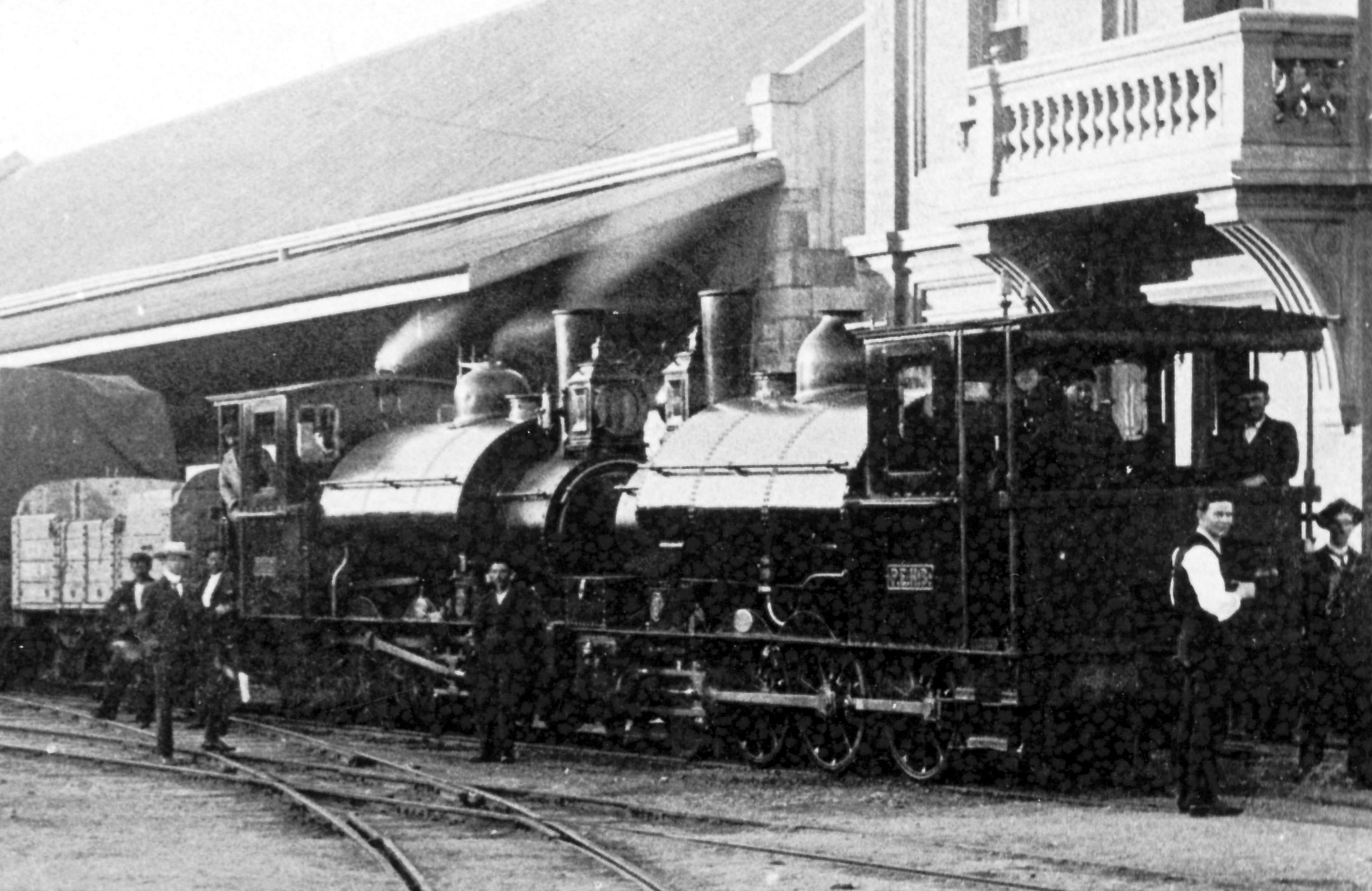
- PEHB engines I and J at Port Elizabeth
Type and origin
- Power type: Steam
- Designer: Kitson and Company
- Builder: Kitson and Company
- Serial number: 4245 (3rd locomotive)
- Build date: 1900, 1903
- Total produced: 3
Specifications
- Configuration
  - Whyte: 2-6-0ST (Mogul)
  - UIC: 1Cn2t
- Driver: 2nd coupled axle
- Gauge: 3 ft 6 in (1,067 mm) Cape gauge
- Leading dia.: 24 in (610 mm)
- Coupled dia.: 39 in (991 mm)
- Wheelbase: 11 ft 4 in (3,454 mm)
  - Axle spacing (Asymmetrical): 1-2: 3 ft 5 in (1,041 mm); 2-3: 4 ft 1 in (1,245 mm)
  - Coupled: 7 ft 6 in (2,286 mm)
- Length: 23 ft 4 in (7,112 mm)
- Height: 11 ft 4 in (3,454 mm)
- Axle load: 7 LT 8 cwt (7,519 kg)
  - Leading: 5 LT 7 cwt (5,436 kg)
  - 1st coupled: 6 LT 16 cwt (6,909 kg)
  - 2nd coupled: 7 LT 8 cwt (7,519 kg)
  - 3rd coupled: 6 LT 4 cwt (6,299 kg)
- Adhesive weight: 20 LT 8 cwt (20,730 kg)
- Loco weight: 25 LT 15 cwt (26,160 kg)
- Fuel type: Coal
- Fuel capacity: 10 long hundredweight (0.5 t)
- Water cap.: 600 imp gal (2,730 L)
- Firebox
  - Type: Round-top
  - Grate area: 10 sq ft (0.93 m^{2})
- Boiler
  - Pitch: 5 ft 8 in (1,727 mm)
  - Diameter: 3 ft 4 in (1,016 mm)
  - Tube plates: 9 ft 3 3/16 in (2,824 mm)
  - Small tubes: 116: 1 3/4 in (44 mm)
- Boiler pressure: 160 psi (1,103 kPa)
- Safety valve: Salter
- Heating surface
  - Firebox: 50 sq ft (4.6 m^{2})
  - Tubes: 494 sq ft (45.9 m^{2})
  - Total surface: 544 sq ft (50.5 m^{2})
- Cylinders: Two
- Cylinder size: 13 in (330 mm) bore 20 in (508 mm) stroke
- Valve gear: Stephenson
- Couplers: Johnston link-and-pin
Performance figures
- Tractive effort: 10,400 lbf (46 kN) @ 75%
Career
- Operators: Port Elizabeth Harbour Board; Cape Government Railways; South African Railways
- Number in class: 3
- Numbers: PEHB I, J & O CGR 1024-1026; SAR 01024-01026
- Delivered: 1900-1904
- First run: 1900
- Withdrawn: 1931

The Cape Government Railways 2-6-0ST of 1900 was a South African steam locomotive from the pre-Union era in the Cape of Good Hope.

In 1900, two 2-6-0 Mogul type saddle-tank locomotives entered service on the Port Elizabeth Harbour works, followed by one more in 1904. They were later taken onto the Cape Government Railways roster and were all still in service when the South African Railways was established in 1912.

== Manufacturer ==
In 1900, two 2-6-0 saddle-tank locomotives were delivered to the Port Elizabeth Harbour Board (PEHB) from Kitson and Company. In 1904, they were followed by one more from the same manufacturer.

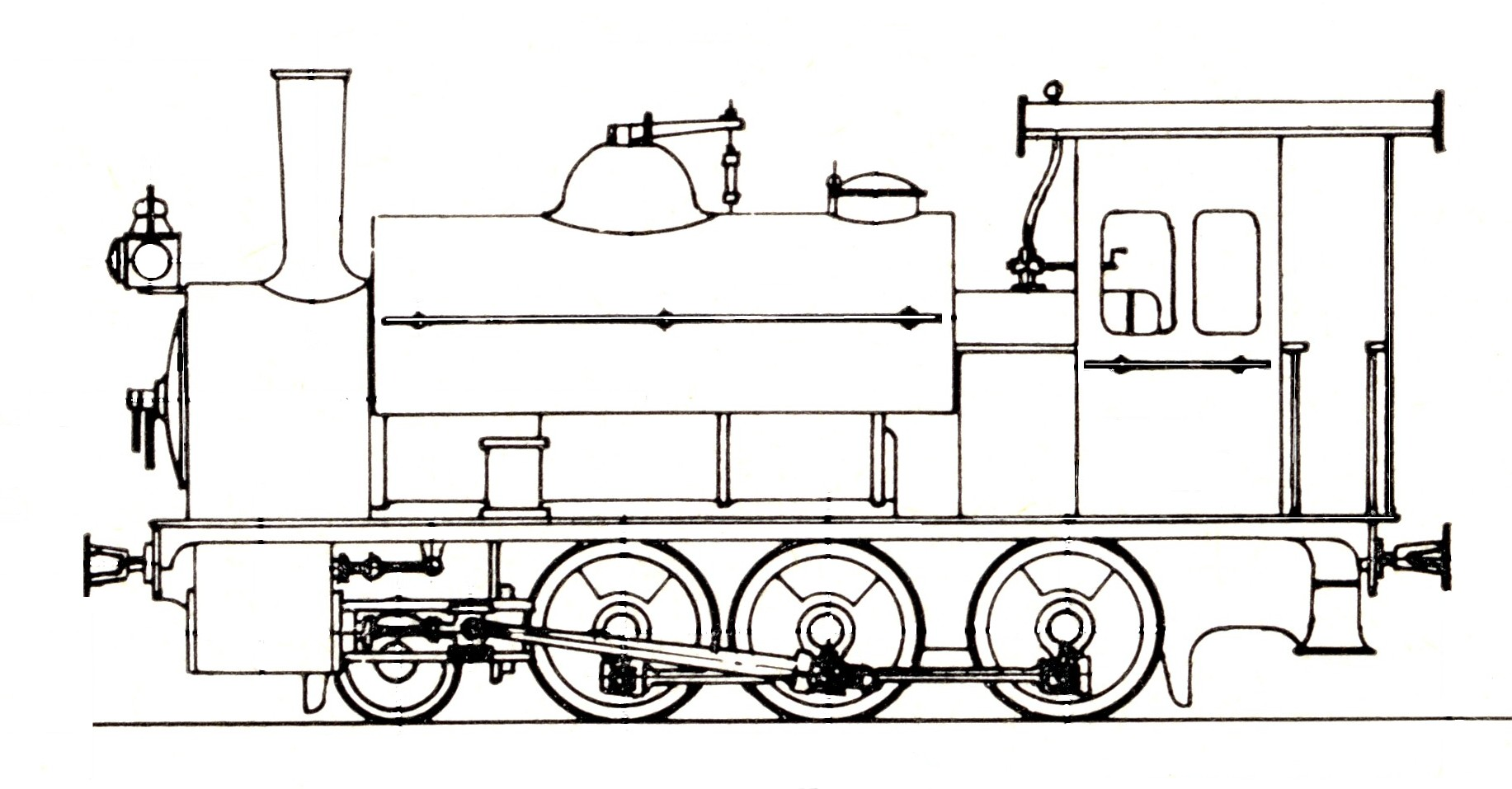
Drawing of PEHB engine O

The builder's works numbers of the first two locomotives are not known, but are probably two of Kitson numbers 4079 to 4083 in respect of which no trial date or owner are given in the Kitson Works Trial Book. The third locomotive, Kitson no. 4245, is listed with trial date 8 December 1903 and customer H Chaplin P.E.H.B. From the trial date, it would follow that the locomotive could only have entered service in Port Elizabeth early in 1904.

The locomotives were similar in appearance and general dimensions to the 1st Class 2-6-0ST of 1876 which had been delivered as a pair of Stephenson's Patent back-to-back side-tank locomotives, before being rebuilt to saddle-tank locomotives by the Cape Government Railways (CGR) in the 1880s. The new locomotives were slightly larger, with an increased heating surface and tractive effort.

== Service ==
=== Port Elizabeth Harbour Board ===
The locomotives were acquired as construction locomotives for use on the Port Elizabeth harbour works. The PEHB used letters to number its locomotives at the time, and the first two of these engines were lettered I and J, while the one which was delivered in 1904 was lettered O.

=== Cape Government Railways ===
In terms of Cape Act 38 of 1908, the Cape Government Railways (CGR) became responsible for the administration of the three major harbours in the Cape of Good Hope with effect from 1 January 1909. The locomotives were therefore all taken onto the CGR roster and renumbered in the range from 1024 to 1026. They spent their entire service lives as dock shunting engines in the Port Elizabeth Harbour.

=== South African Railways ===
When the Union of South Africa was established on 31 May 1910, the three Colonial government railways (CGR, Natal Government Railways and Central South African Railways) were united under a single administration to control and administer the railways, ports and harbours of the Union. Although the South African Railways and Harbours came into existence in 1910, the actual classification and renumbering of all the rolling stock of the three constituent railways were only implemented with effect from 1 January 1912.

In 1912, the locomotives were considered obsolete by the SAR and renumbered by having the numeral "0" prefixed to their existing engine numbers. Even though obsolete, they remained in service until 1931.
