= NGR Class I 2-6-2T =

Type of steam locomotive

Zululand Railway 2-6-2T NGR Class I 2-6-2T
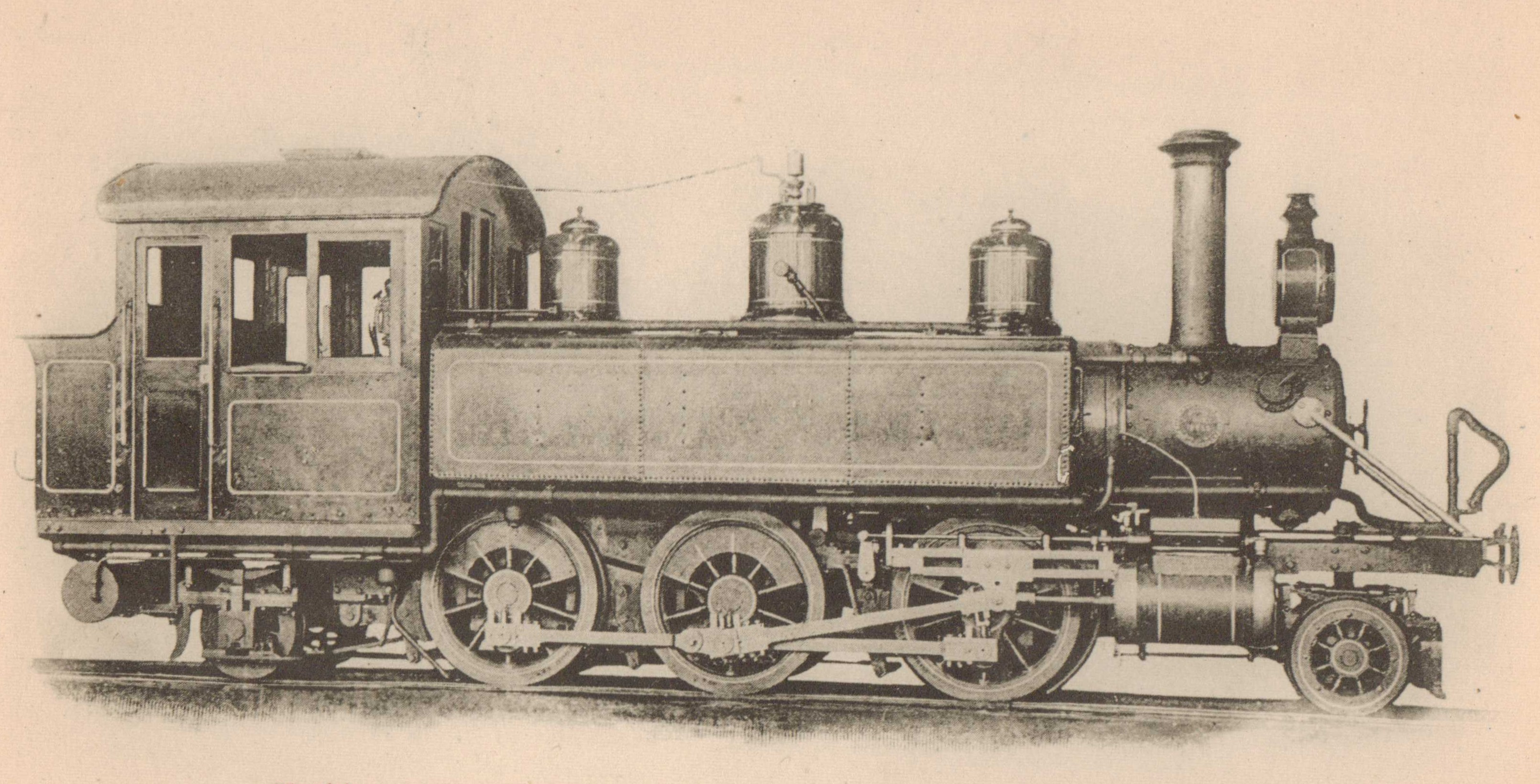
- Zululand Railway Company no. 1, c. 1901
Type and origin
- Power type: Steam
- Designer: Baldwin Locomotive Works
- Builder: Baldwin Locomotive Works
- Serial number: 18565
- Build date: 1901
- Total produced: 1
Specifications
- Configuration
  - Whyte: 2-6-2T (Prairie)
  - UIC: 1'C1'n2t
- Driver: 2nd coupled axle
- Gauge: 3 ft 6 in (1,067 mm) Cape gauge
- Leading dia.: 24 in (610 mm)
- Coupled dia.: 41 in (1,041 mm)
- Trailing dia.: 24 in (610 mm)
- Wheelbase: 20 ft 8 in (6,299 mm)
  - Axle spacing (Asymmetrical): 1-2: 4 ft 8 in (1,422 mm); 2-3: 4 ft 4 in (1,321 mm)
  - Coupled: 9 ft (2,743 mm)
- Length
  - Over couplers: 28 ft 10 in (8,788 mm)
- Height: 10 ft 9 in (3,277 mm)
- Frame type: Bar
- Axle load: 6 LT 16 cwt (6,909 kg)
  - Leading: 2 LT 15 cwt (2,794 kg)
  - 1st coupled: 5 LT 8 cwt (5,487 kg)
  - 2nd coupled: 6 LT 4 cwt (6,299 kg)
  - 3rd coupled: 6 LT 16 cwt (6,909 kg)
  - Trailing: 2 LT 16 cwt (2,845 kg)
- Adhesive weight: 18 LT 8 cwt (18,700 kg)
- Loco weight: 23 LT 19 cwt (24,330 kg)
- Fuel type: Coal
- Fuel capacity: 2 LT 5 cwt (2.3 t)
- Water cap.: 542 imp gal (2,460 L)
- Firebox
  - Type: Round-top
  - Grate area: 12 sq ft (1.1 m^{2})
- Boiler
  - Pitch: 5 ft 1 in (1,549 mm)
  - Tube plates: 7 ft 6 in (2,286 mm)
- Boiler pressure: 160 psi (1,103 kPa)
- Heating surface
  - Firebox: 46 sq ft (4.3 m^{2})
  - Tubes: 350 sq ft (33 m^{2})
  - Total surface: 396 sq ft (36.8 m^{2})
- Cylinders: Two
- Cylinder size: 12 in (305 mm) bore 18 in (457 mm) stroke
- Valve gear: Stephenson
- Valve type: Slide
- Couplers: Johnston link-and-pin
Performance figures
- Tractive effort: 7,585 lbf (33.74 kN) @ 75%
Career
- Operators: Zululand Railway Co. Natal Government Railways
- Number in class: 1
- Numbers: ZRC 1, NGR 512 & 501, SAR 0501
- Delivered: 1901
- First run: 1901
- Withdrawn: 1916

The Natal Government Railways Class I 2-6-2T of 1901 was a South African steam locomotive from the pre-Union era in the Colony of Natal.

In 1894, the Natal Government made provision for the extension of the North Coast line from Verulam to the Tugela River. The Zululand Railway Company was contracted for the construction of the line in 1895. In 1901, the company acquired one 2-6-2 side-tank locomotive as construction engine. Upon completion of the line in 1903, the locomotive was taken onto the roster of the Natal Government Railways and designated Class I.

== Zululand Railway Company ==
Provision for the extension of the North Coast line from Verulam to the Tugela River was made by Act 34 of 1894 of the Colony of Natal. On 19 December 1895, an agreement was reached with the Natal sugar magnate James Liege Hulett, representing the Zululand Railway Company, for the construction of the new line.

The government stipulated that the line was to be 3 feet 6 inches Cape gauge and laid with 45 pounds per yard (22 kilograms per metre) steel rail. The agreement further stipulated that, upon its completion, the line would be taken over as part of the Natal Government Railways (NGR) system.

== Manufacturer ==
In 1901, the construction company acquired a single 2-6-2T locomotive from Baldwin Locomotive Works in the United States of America, for use as construction engine. The locomotive, which became the Zululand Railway no. 1, was designed and built to American specifications and narrow-gauge practice at the time and, as a result, conformed to NGR practice only in respect of its Johnston link-and-pin couplers and brake gear.

== Characteristics ==
The cylinders were arranged outside the bar frame while the slide valves, arranged above the cylinders, were actuated by Stephenson link motion through rocker shafts. Two sandboxes were mounted atop the boiler, fore and aft of the steam dome.

== Service ==
The Tugela line was opened to traffic in 1903 and Zululand no. 1 was taken onto the NGR roster, where it was allocated no. 512.

It was later renumbered to 501 and was allocated to the Construction Department of the NGR. When a classification system was introduced at some stage between 1904 and 1908, it was designated NGR Class I.

When the Union of South Africa was established on 31 May 1910, the three Colonial government railways (Cape Government Railways, NGR and Central South African Railways) were united under a single administration to control and administer the railways, ports and harbours of the Union. Although the South African Railways and Harbours came into existence in 1910, the actual classification and renumbering of all the rolling stock of the three constituent railways were only implemented with effect from 1 January 1912.

In 1912, the Construction Department locomotives in Natal were considered obsolete. The locomotive was excluded from the South African Railways classification and renumbering schedules, renumbered to 0501 and remained unclassified. It was scrapped in March 1916.
