= South African Class 6F 4-6-0 =

1900 design of steam locomotive

CGR 6th Class 4-6-0 1900 South African Class 6F 4-6-0
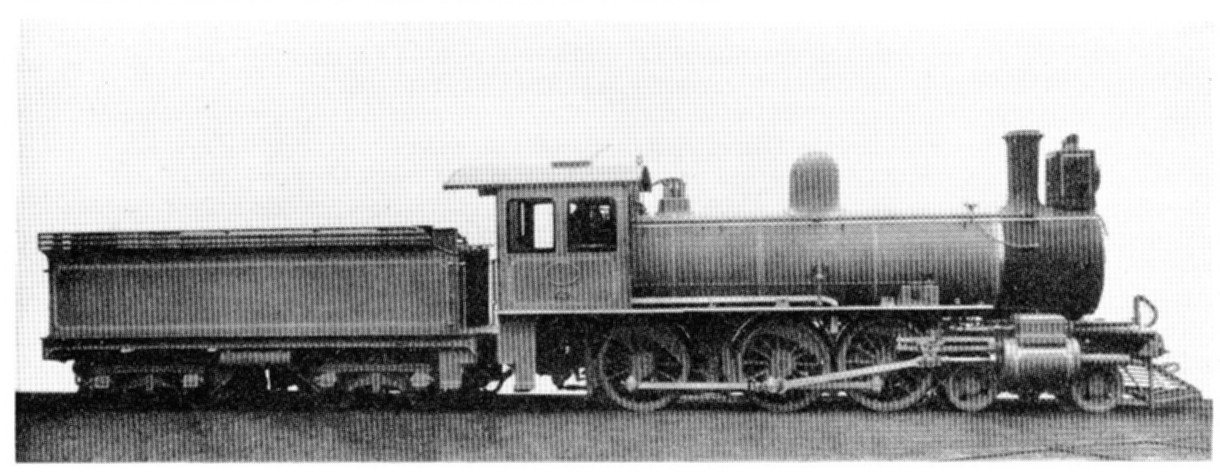
- Ex CGR 6th Class, SAR Class 6F
Type and origin
- Power type: Steam
- Designer: Cape Government Railways (H.M. Beatty)
- Builder: Sharp, Stewart and Company
- Serial number: 4631–4632
- Model: CGR 6th Class
- Build date: 1900
- Total produced: 2
Specifications
- Configuration
  - Whyte: 4-6-0 (Tenwheeler)
  - UIC: 2'Cn2
- Driver: 2nd coupled axle
- Gauge: 3 ft 6 in (1,067 mm) Cape gauge
- Leading dia.: 28 1/2 in (724 mm)
- Coupled dia.: 54 in (1,372 mm)
- Tender wheels: 33 1/2 in (851 mm)
- Wheelbase: 47 ft 2 1/2 in (14,389 mm)
  - Axle spacing (Asymmetrical): 1-2: 4 ft 9 in (1,448 mm); 2-3: 6 ft 7 in (2,007 mm)
  - Engine: 20 ft 8 in (6,299 mm)
  - Leading: 5 ft 6 in (1,676 mm)
  - Coupled: 11 ft 4 in (3,454 mm)
  - Tender: 16 ft 1 in (4,902 mm)
  - Tender bogie: 4 ft 7 in (1,397 mm)
- Length
  - Over couplers: 54 ft 6 5/8 in (16,627 mm)
- Height: 12 ft 10 in (3,912 mm)
- Frame type: Bar
- Axle load: 12 LT 7 cwt (12,550 kg)
  - Leading: 10 LT 11 cwt (10,720 kg)
  - 1st coupled: 12 LT 7 cwt (12,550 kg)
  - 2nd coupled: 12 LT 6 cwt (12,500 kg)
  - 3rd coupled: 12 LT 7 cwt (12,550 kg)
  - Tender bogie: Bogie 1: 17 LT 14 cwt (17,980 kg); Bogie 2: 18 LT 14 cwt (19,000 kg)
- Adhesive weight: 37 LT (37,590 kg)
- Loco weight: 47 LT 11 cwt (48,310 kg)
- Tender weight: 36 LT 8 cwt (36,980 kg)
- Total weight: 83 LT 19 cwt (85,300 kg)
- Tender type: 2-axle bogies
- Fuel type: Coal
- Fuel capacity: 6 LT (6.1 t)
- Water cap.: 2,780 imp gal (12,600 L)
- Firebox
  - Type: Round-top
  - Grate area: 18.75 sq ft (1.742 m^{2})
- Boiler
  - Pitch: 6 ft 9 in (2,057 mm)
  - Diameter: 4 ft 7 in (1,397 mm)
  - Tube plates: 11 ft 2 1/8 in (3,407 mm)
  - Small tubes: 182: 2 in (51 mm)
- Boiler pressure: 180 psi (1,241 kPa)
- Safety valve: Ramsbottom
- Heating surface
  - Firebox: 105 sq ft (9.8 m^{2})
  - Tubes: 1,065 sq ft (98.9 m^{2})
  - Total surface: 1,170 sq ft (109 m^{2})
- Cylinders: Two
- Cylinder size: 17 in (432 mm) bore 26 in (660 mm) stroke
- Valve gear: Stephenson
- Couplers: Johnston link-and-pin
Performance figures
- Tractive effort: 18,780 lbf (83.5 kN) @ 75%
Career
- Operators: Cape Government Railways; South African Railways
- Class: CGR 6th Class, SAR Class 6F
- Number in class: 2
- Numbers: CGR 260-261; SAR 604-605
- Delivered: 1900
- First run: 1900
- Withdrawn: 1929

The South African Railways Class 6F 4-6-0 of 1900 was a steam locomotive from the pre-Union era in the Cape of Good Hope.

In 1900, two redesigned 6th Class 4-6-0 steam locomotives were placed in service by the Cape Government Railways. In 1912, when they were assimilated into the South African Railways, they were renumbered and designated Class 6F.

== Manufacturer ==
The original 6th Class 4-6-0 passenger steam locomotive was designed at the Salt River works of the Cape Government Railways (CGR) in 1893, at the same time as the 7th Class and both according to the specifications of Michael Stephens, then Chief Locomotive Superintendent of the CGR, and under the supervision of H.M. Beatty, then Locomotive Superintendent of the Western System.

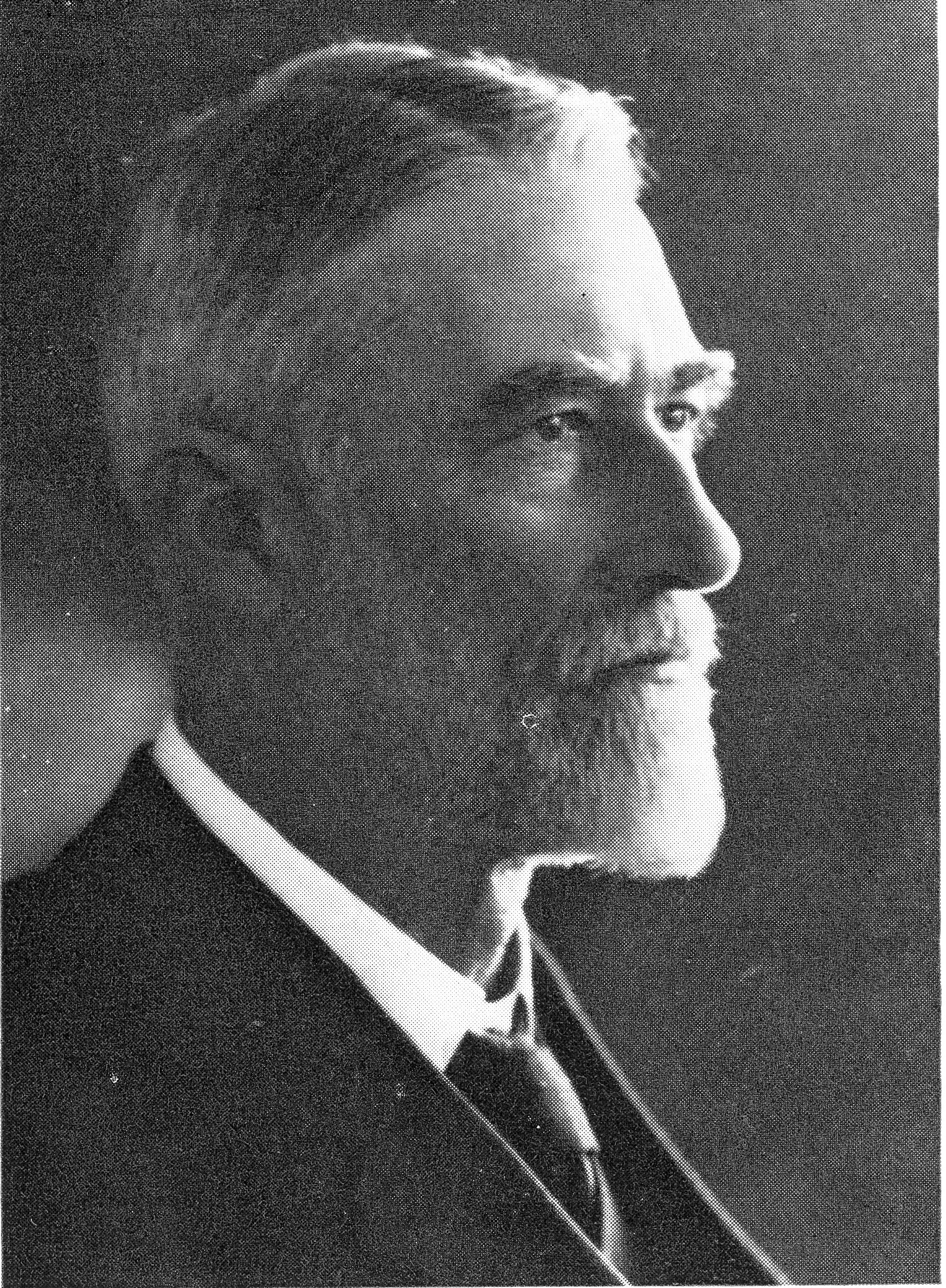
H.M. Beatty

The two 6th Class locomotives which entered service on the CGR in 1900 were built by Sharp, Stewart and Company, numbered 260 and 261 and allocated to the Western System. They were equipped with large commodious cabs, which were to become standard in all subsequent designs. They had larger heating surfaces and grate areas than any of the previous 6th Class locomotives, with the boiler pressure increased to 180 pounds per square inch (1,241 kilopascals) and with larger tenders which rode on bogies. They differed in appearance from all previous 6th Class locomotives by having higher mounted running boards without coupled wheel fairings. They proved to be good engines and were better steamers.

These engines reflected the decision by Beatty, who had succeeded Michael Stephens as Chief Locomotive Superintendent in 1895, to adopt bar frames for future CGR locomotives. He thereby demonstrated that, while still keeping to the good points of the locomotives he had designed under Stephens' supervision, he was preparing to adopt his own ideas in his future locomotive designs.

== Class 6 sub-classes ==
When the Union of South Africa was established on 31 May 1910, the three Colonial government railways (CGR, Natal Government Railways and Central South African Railways) were united under a single administration to control and administer the railways, ports and harbours of the Union. Although the South African Railways and Harbours came into existence in 1910, the actual classification and renumbering of all the rolling stock of the three constituent railways were only implemented with effect from 1 January 1912.

When these two locomotives were assimilated into the South African Railways (SAR) in 1912, they were renumbered 604 and 605 and designated Class 6F.

The rest of the CGR's 6th Class locomotives, together with 6th Class locomotives which had been inherited from the Oranje-Vrijstaat Gouwerment-Spoorwegen (OVGS) via the Imperial Military Railways (IMR) and the Central South African Railways (CSAR), were grouped into thirteen more sub-classes by the SAR. The 4-6-0 locomotives became SAR Classes 6, 6A to 6E, 6G, 6H and 6J to 6L, the 2-6-2 locomotives became Class 6Y and the 2-6-4 locomotives became Class 6Z.

== Service ==
The Class 6 series of locomotives were introduced primarily as passenger locomotives, but when the class became displaced by larger and more powerful locomotive classes, it literally became a Jack-of-all-trades which proved itself as one of the most useful and successful locomotive classes ever to be designed at the Salt River shops. It went on to see service in all parts of the country, except in Natal, and was used on all types of traffic.

The two Class 6F locomotives were placed in service on the Cape mainline. Compared to most of the rest of the Class 6 family, they had a relatively short lifespan of less than thirty years and were withdrawn from service by 1929.
