= CGR 1st Class 4-4-0 =

South African locomotive

CGR 1st Class 4-4-0 South African Class 01 4-4-0
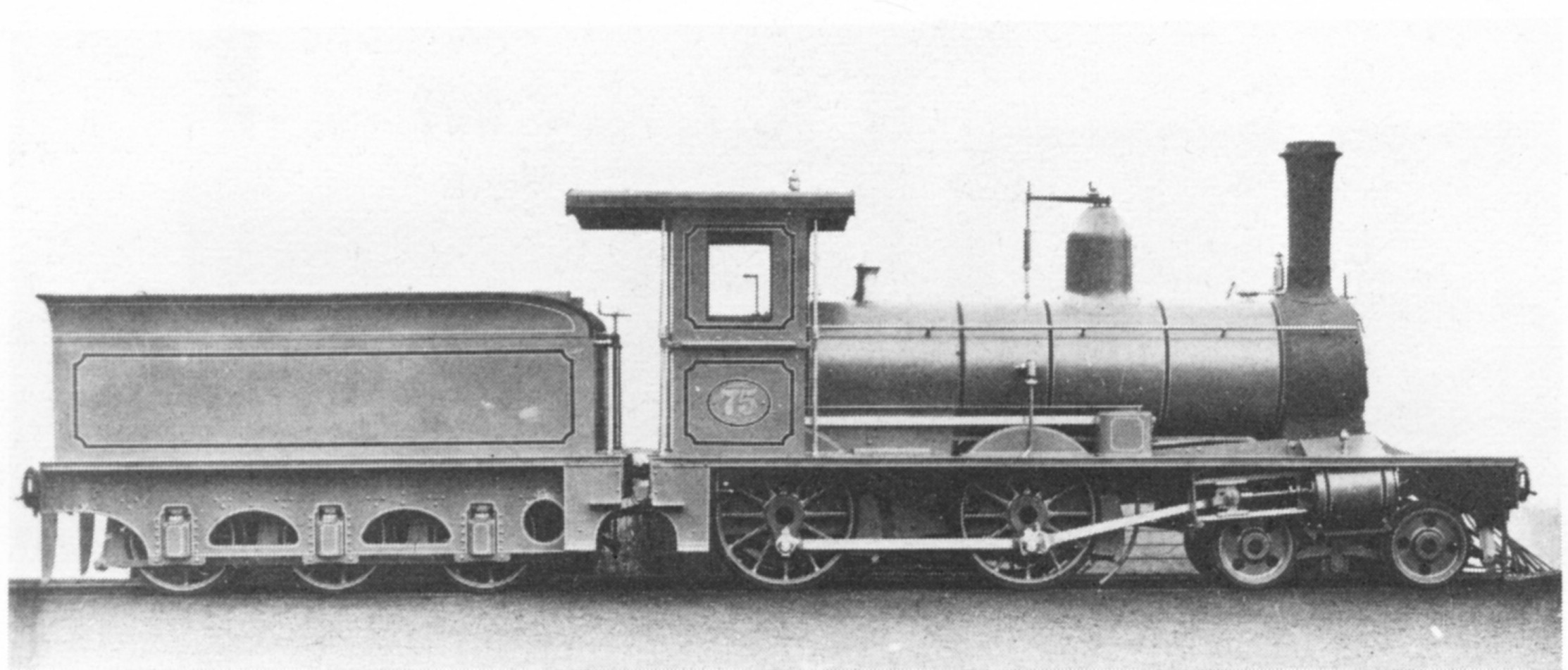
- Works picture of CGR 1st Class 4-4-0, c. 1879
Type and origin
- Power type: Steam
- Designer: Avonside Engine Company
- Builder: Avonside Engine Company; Neilson and Company
- Serial number: Avonside 1215-1216, 1235-1236; Neilson 2547-2552, 2557-2560, 2582
- Build date: 1879-1880
- Total produced: 15
Specifications
- Configuration
  - Whyte: 4-4-0 (American)
  - UIC: 2′Bn2
- Driver: 1st coupled axle
- Gauge: 3 ft 6 in (1,067 mm) Cape gauge
- Leading dia.: 27 in (686 mm)
- Coupled dia.: 48 in (1,219 mm)
- Tender wheels: 36 in (914 mm)
- Wheelbase: 33 ft 4 in (10,160 mm)
  - Engine: 17 ft 4 in (5,283 mm)
  - Leading: 4 ft 8 in (1,422 mm)
  - Coupled: 6 ft 6 in (1,981 mm)
  - Tender: 8 ft (2,438 mm)
- Length
  - Over couplers: 41 ft 4 in (12,598 mm)
- Height: 12 ft (3,658 mm)
- Axle load: 8 LT 1 cwt (8,179 kg)
  - Leading: 7 LT 3 cwt (7,265 kg)
  - 1st coupled: 7 LT 19 cwt 1 qtr (8,090 kg)
  - 2nd coupled: 8 LT 1 cwt (8,179 kg)
- Adhesive weight: 16 LT 0 cwt 1 qtr (16,270 kg)
- Loco weight: 23 LT 3 cwt 1 qtr (23,530 kg)
- Tender weight: 16 LT 19 cwt 1 qtr (17,230 kg)
- Total weight: 40 LT 2 cwt 2 qtr (40,770 kg)
- Tender type: 3-axle
- Fuel type: Coal
- Fuel capacity: 2 LT 10 cwt (2.5 t)
- Water cap.: 1,700 imp gal (7,730 L)
- Firebox
  - Type: Round-top
  - Grate area: 10 sq ft (0.93 m^{2})
- Boiler
  - Pitch: 5 ft 9 in (1,753 mm)
  - Tube plates: 9 ft 5 1/2 in (2,883 mm)
  - Small tubes: 120: 1 3/4 in (44 mm)
- Boiler pressure: 130 psi (896 kPa)
- Safety valve: Salter
- Heating surface
  - Firebox: 52 sq ft (4.8 m^{2})
  - Tubes: 513 sq ft (47.7 m^{2})
  - Total surface: 565 sq ft (52.5 m^{2})
- Cylinders: Two
- Cylinder size: 14 in (356 mm) bore 18 in (457 mm) stroke
- Valve gear: Stephenson
- Valve type: Slide
- Couplers: Johnston link-and-pin
Performance figures
- Tractive effort: 7,166 lbf (32 kN) @ 75%
Career
- Operators: Cape Government Railways; South African Railways
- Class: CGR 1st Class, SAR Class 01
- Number in class: 15
- Numbers: E8-E14, W25-W26, W33-W38
- Delivered: 1879
- First run: 1879

The Cape Government Railways 1st Class 4-4-0 of 1879 was a South African steam locomotive from the pre-Union era in the Cape of Good Hope.

In 1878, the Cape Government Railways placed orders with the Avonside Engine Company for four more 1st Class tender locomotives with a 4-4-0 American type wheel arrangement. They were intended for fast passenger service on the Western and Eastern Systems and were delivered in 1879. In 1880, eleven more of these locomotives followed from Neilson and Company.

== Traffic growth ==
By 1878, increased traffic on the Western System of the Cape Government Railways (CGR) had given rise to a requirement for higher train speeds, which subjected most of the existing mainline locomotives with their small 39 inches (991 millimetres) diameter coupled wheels to rapid wear and resulted in the need for frequent heavy repairs. To meet the rising traffic requirements, orders were placed with Avonside Engine Company for more locomotives with larger diameter coupled wheels, in addition to the existing fleet of 1st Class 4-4-0 tank-and-optional-tender locomotives of 1875.

== Manufacturers ==
In 1879, four 4-4-0 American type tender passenger locomotives were delivered to the CGR from Avonside Engine Company for fast passenger service out of Cape Town and East London respectively. They were equipped with 48 inches (1,219 millimetres) coupled wheels and six-wheeled tenders, numbered W25 and W26 for the Western System and E8 and E9 for the Eastern System. Their slide valves were actuated by Stephenson Link motion, while their boiler barrels were constructed in three sections, arranged telescopically.

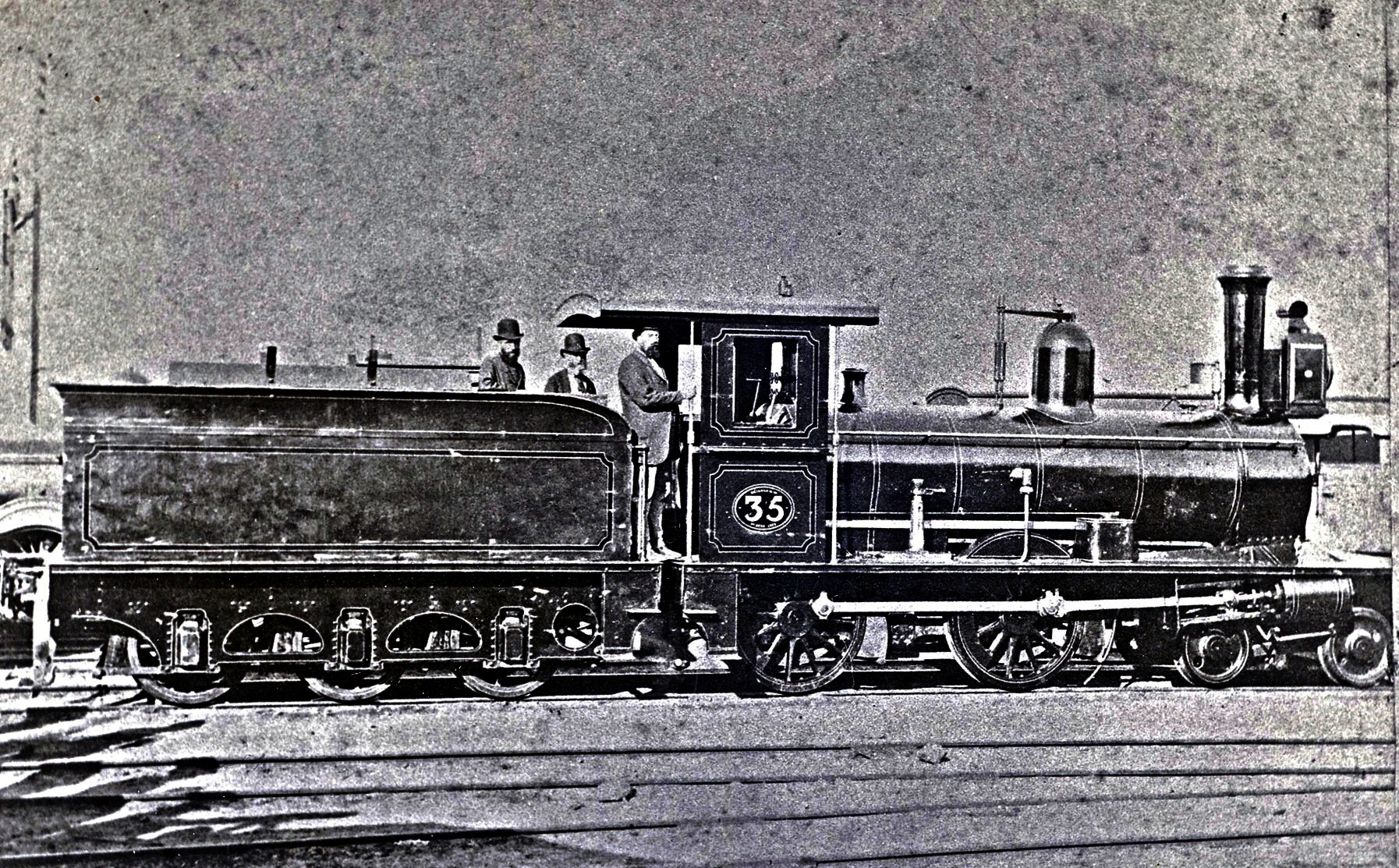
1st Class 4-4-0 no. W35

In 1880, they were followed by another eleven locomotives. These were built by Neilson and Company and numbered in the ranges from W33 to W38 for the Western System and E10 to E14 for the Eastern System. This was the first CGR locomotive contract to be awarded to Neilson's.

Depicted is engine no. W35, when new, with the Western System officials who were responsible for the locomotive fleet on board, from left Workshop Foreman E.A. Goodwin, Locomotive Superintendent Michael Stephens and Steamshed Foreman McNamara.

== Classification ==
When a locomotive classification system was later introduced by the CGR, all these locomotives were designated 1st Class. Although Espitalier and Day described them in 1943 as 2nd Class, the Classification of S.A.R. Engines with Renumbering Lists, a booklet which was issued by the Chief Mechanical Engineer's Office in January 1912, lists them as "4-4-0 1st class Avonside & Neilson".

== Service ==
=== Cape Government Railways ===
As a result of the distances involved on the new mainlines which were being built into the arid Karoo, the CGR favoured tender locomotives over tank locomotives for mainline work from the outset, given the limited onboard coal and water capacities of tank engines. At the time these locomotives entered service in 1879, the two Eastern System lines from East London were open as far as King William's Town and approaching Queenstown respectively, while the Western System line from Montagu Road was approaching Beaufort West.

The Western line was officially opened to Beaufort West on 5 February 1880. In 1882, one of these new locomotives made a through trip on a special train between Cape Town and Beaufort West and covered the 339 miles (546 kilometres) in ten hours, stops excluded, maintaining an average speed of 34 miles per hour (55 kilometres per hour). At the time, it was the fastest long journey on record in South Africa.

=== South African Railways ===
When the Union of South Africa was established on 31 May 1910, the three Colonial government railways (CGR, Natal Government Railways and Central South African Railways) were united under a single administration to control and administer the railways, ports and harbours of the Union. Although the South African Railways and Harbours came into existence in 1910, the actual classification and renumbering of all the rolling stock of the three constituent railways was only implemented with effect from 1 January 1912.

In 1912, the nine surviving locomotives were considered obsolete by the SAR, designated Class 01 and renumbered by having the numeral 0 prefixed to their existing numbers. They were all withdrawn from service by 1915, after having completed a considerable mileage while serving on branchlines after being withdrawn from mainline work.

== Renumbering ==
All these locomotives were renumbered at times during the CGR era. By 1886, all the system prefixes had been done away with and, of the Eastern System's locomotives, three were no longer on the books, while the remaining four had been renumbered in the range from 606 to 609. By 1890, the two Avonside locomotives of the Western System had also been renumbered. By 1910, three more locomotives were no longer on the books and in 1912 the nine remaining locomotives were renumbered with an 0 prefix by the SAR. The builders, works numbers, years in service, original numbers and renumbering of the Cape 1st Class of 1879 are listed in the table.

CGR 1st Class 4-4-0 of 1879
Builder	Works no.	Year	Orig. no.	1886 no.	1890 no.	1904 no.	SAR no.
Avonside	1215	1879	W25	25	31	31	031
Avonside	1216	1879	W26	26	32	32	032
Avonside	1235	1879	E8	8			
Avonside	1236	1879	E9	9			
Neilson	2547	1880	W33	33	33	33	033
Neilson	2548	1880	W34	34	34	34	034
Neilson	2549	1880	W35	35	35	35	035
Neilson	2550	1880	W36	36	36	36	
Neilson	2551	1880	W37	37	37	37	037
Neilson	2552	1880	W38	38	38	38	038
Neilson	2557	1880	E10	10			
Neilson	2558	1880	E11	11	606	606	0606
Neilson	2559	1880	E12	12	607	607	
Neilson	2560	1880	E13	13	608	608	
Neilson	2582	1880	E14	14	609	609	0609
