= South African Class NG6 4-4-0 =

1895 narrow-gauge steam locomotive

Beira Railway Lawley 4-4-0 South African Class NG6 4-4-0
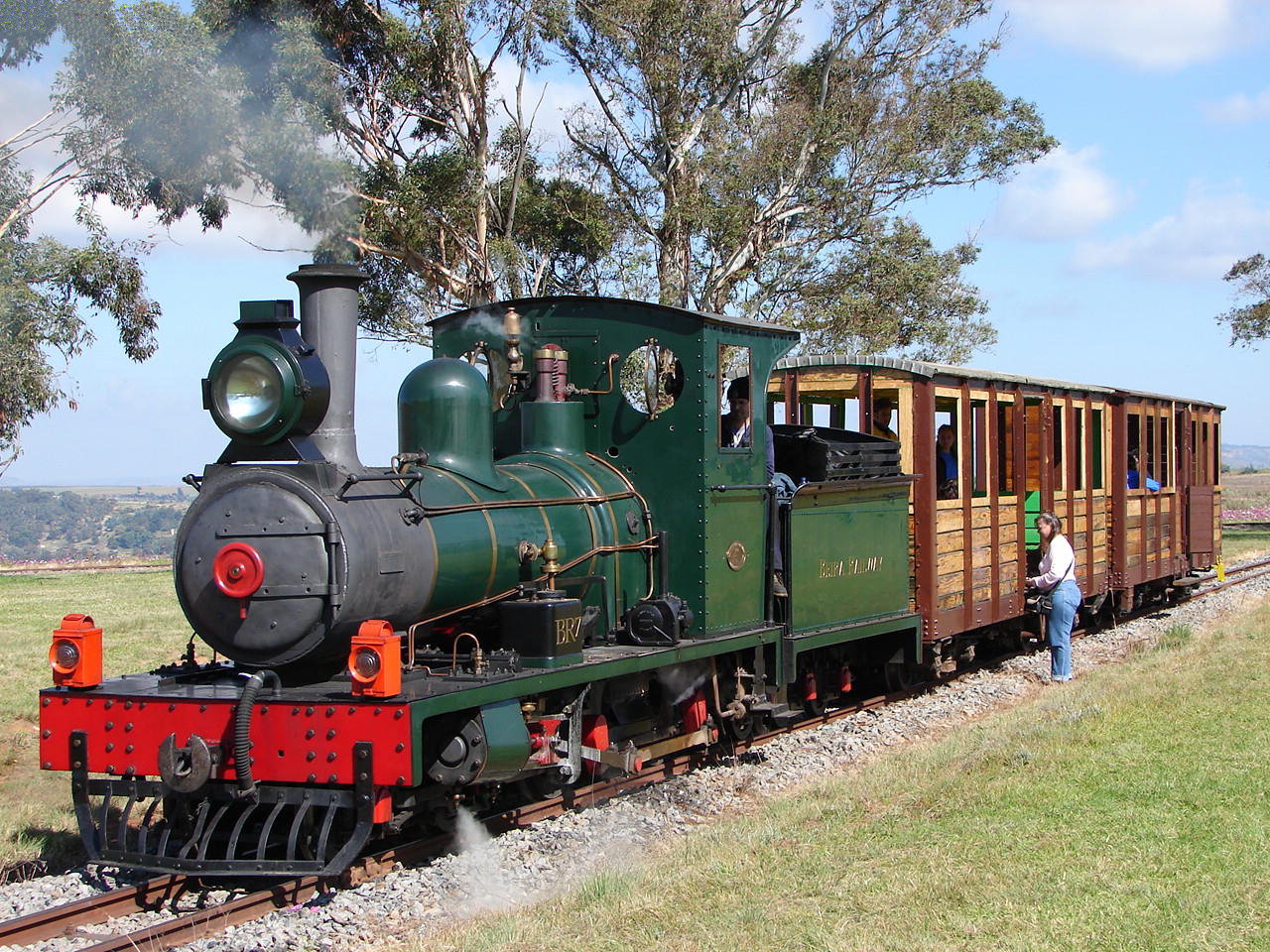
- Falcon F2, Beira Railway no. BR6, SAR no. NG106, restored as no. BR7, Sandstone Estates, 9 April 2006
Type and origin
- ♠ Falcon F2 – ♥ Falcon F4
- Power type: Steam
- Designer: Falcon Engine and Car Works
- Builder: Falcon Engine and Car Works; Glasgow Railway Engineering
- Model: Falcon F2 & F4
- Build date: 1895-1898
- Total produced: 42 (6 F2 & 36 F4)
Specifications
- Configuration
  - Whyte: 4-4-0 (American)
  - UIC: 2'Bn2
- Driver: 1st coupled axle
- Gauge: 2 ft (610 mm) narrow
- Leading dia.: 24 in (610 mm)
- Coupled dia.: ♠ 32 in (813 mm) ♥ 36 in (914 mm)
- Tender wheels: 24 in (610 mm)
- Wheelbase: ♠ 25 ft 2 1/4 in (7,677 mm) ♥ 26 ft (7,925 mm)
  - Engine: ♠ 13 ft 9 1/4 in (4,197 mm) ♥ 14 ft (4,267 mm)
  - Leading: 3 ft 10 in (1,168 mm)
  - Coupled: 5 ft 5 in (1,651 mm)
  - Tender: 6 ft (1,829 mm) (3-axle)
- Length
  - Over couplers: 31 ft 5 1/2 in (9,588 mm)
- Width: 6 ft 4 in (1,930 mm)
- Height: 9 ft 6 3/4 in (2,915 mm)
- Axle load: 4 LT 10 cwt (4,572 kg)
  - Leading: 5 LT (5,080 kg)
  - Coupled: 4 LT 10 cwt (4,572 kg)
- Adhesive weight: 9 LT (9,144 kg)
- Loco weight: 14 LT (14,220 kg)
- Tender weight: ♠ 6 LT 10 cwt (6,604 kg) ♥ 7 LT 10 cwt (7,620 kg)
- Total weight: ♠ 20 LT 10 cwt (20,830 kg) ♥ 21 LT 10 cwt (21,850 kg)
- Tender type: 3-axle
- Fuel type: Coal
- Fuel capacity: 2 LT (2.0 t)
- Water cap.: 780 imp gal (3,550 L)
- Firebox
  - Type: Round-top
  - Grate area: ♠ 4.5 sq ft (0.42 m^{2}) ♥ 5.25 sq ft (0.488 m^{2})
- Boiler
  - Pitch: 4 ft 8 1/2 in (1,435 mm)
  - Diameter: 2 ft 8 1/4 in (819 mm)
  - Tube plates: 7 ft 1 11/16 in (2,176 mm)
  - Small tubes: ♠ 75: 1 3/4 in (44 mm)
- Boiler pressure: 140 psi (965 kPa)
- Safety valve: ♠ Salter – ♥ Ramsbottom
- Heating surface
  - Firebox: ♠ 29 sq ft (2.7 m^{2}) ♥ 30 sq ft (2.8 m^{2})
  - Tubes: ♠ 233 sq ft (21.6 m^{2}) ♥ 246 sq ft (22.9 m^{2})
  - Total surface: ♠ 262 sq ft (24.3 m^{2}) ♥ 276 sq ft (25.6 m^{2})
- Cylinders: Two
- Cylinder size: ♠ 8 in (203 mm) bore ♥ 9 in (229 mm) bore ♠♥ 15 in (381 mm) stroke
- Valve gear: Stephenson
- Loco brake: Handbrake
- Train brakes: Vacuum
- Couplers: Bell-and-hook
Performance figures
- Tractive effort: ♠ 3,000 lbf (13 kN) @ 75% ♥ 3,987 lbf (17.74 kN) @ 75%
Career
- Operators: Beira Eailway; Ayrshire Railway; South African Railways
- Class: SAR Class NG6
- Number in class: BR 42, SAR 13
- Numbers: BR 4-45; SAR NG96-NG108
- Nicknames: Lawley
- Delivered: 1895-1898
- First run: 1895
- Withdrawn: 1935

The South African Railways Class NG6 4-4-0 of 1895 was an ex-Mozambican narrow-gauge steam locomotive from the Beira Railway era.

Between 1895 and 1898, Pauling and Company placed 42 Falcon-built types F2 and F4 tender steam locomotives with a 4-4-0 American type wheel arrangement in service on the two-foot narrow-gauge line which was being constructed for the Beira Railway in Mozambique. In 1915, thirteen of these locomotives were acquired by the South African Railways to replace locomotives which had been commandeered by the Union Defence Forces for use in German South West Africa during the First World War.

At the end of the war, these locomotives were staged, but in 1921 they were placed back in service by the South African Railways. When a system of grouping narrow-gauge locomotives into classes was eventually introduced somewhere between 1928 and 1930, they were designated Class NG6.

== The Beira Railway ==
Construction of the first 2 ft (610 mm) narrow-gauge railway in Southern Africa began in 1892. This was the 370-kilometre-long (230-mile) line of the narrow-gauge Beira Railway which eventually stretched from Beira in Mozambique to Umtali across the Rhodesian border. The border was reached in October 1897 and the full line to Umtali was opened to traffic on 4 February 1898. The work was undertaken by Pauling and Company and was subcontracted to Alfred Lawley.

== Manufacturers and characteristics ==
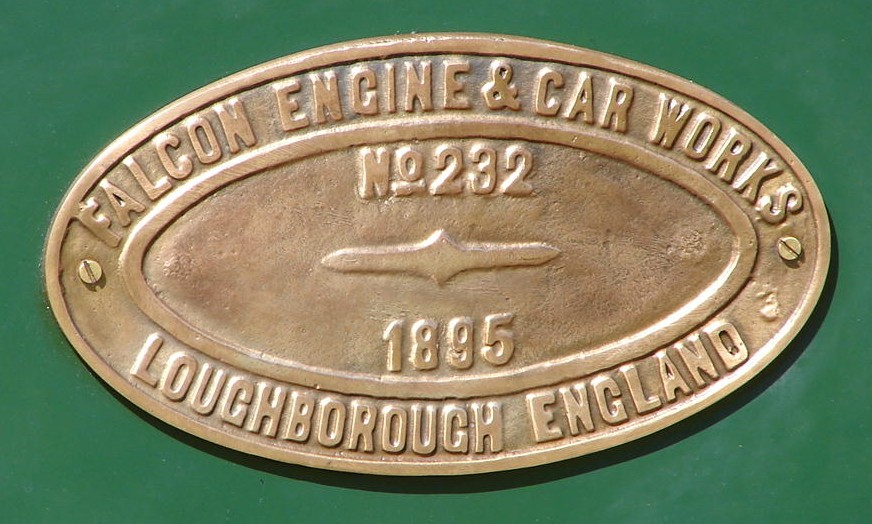
Falcon works plate

Between 1895 and 1898, the Beira Railway placed 42 Falcon types F2 and F4 tender steam locomotives with a 4-4-0 American type wheel arrangement in service, supplied in six batches by Falcon Engine and Car Works Limited in England and the Glasgow Railway Engineering Company in Scotland. In service, these locomotives were soon nicknamed Lawleys, after the Beira Railway construction subcontractor.

=== Falcon F2 ===
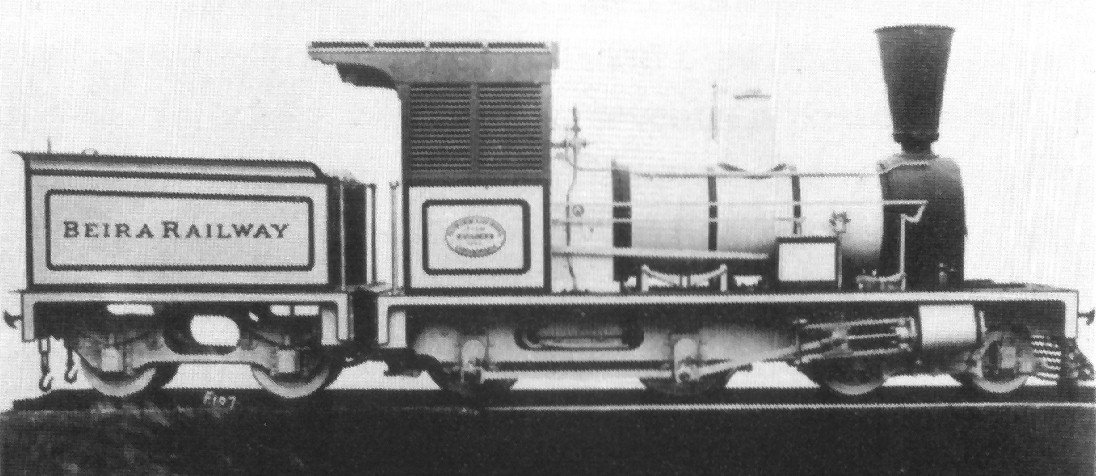
Falcon F2

The first of the Falcon F2 locomotives differed from later models of its class by having a cab which was similar to the Beira Railway's earlier three 0-6-0 locomotives, with two rectangular louvred cab windows on each side. Its boiler dome was fitted with a Salter safety valve. The locomotive was delivered by Falcon in 1895 and was numbered BR4.

A further five F2 locomotives were ordered from Falcon and were also delivered in 1895, numbered in the range from BR5 to BR9. They differed in appearance from the first F2 locomotive by having larger single cab windows.

=== Falcon F4 ===
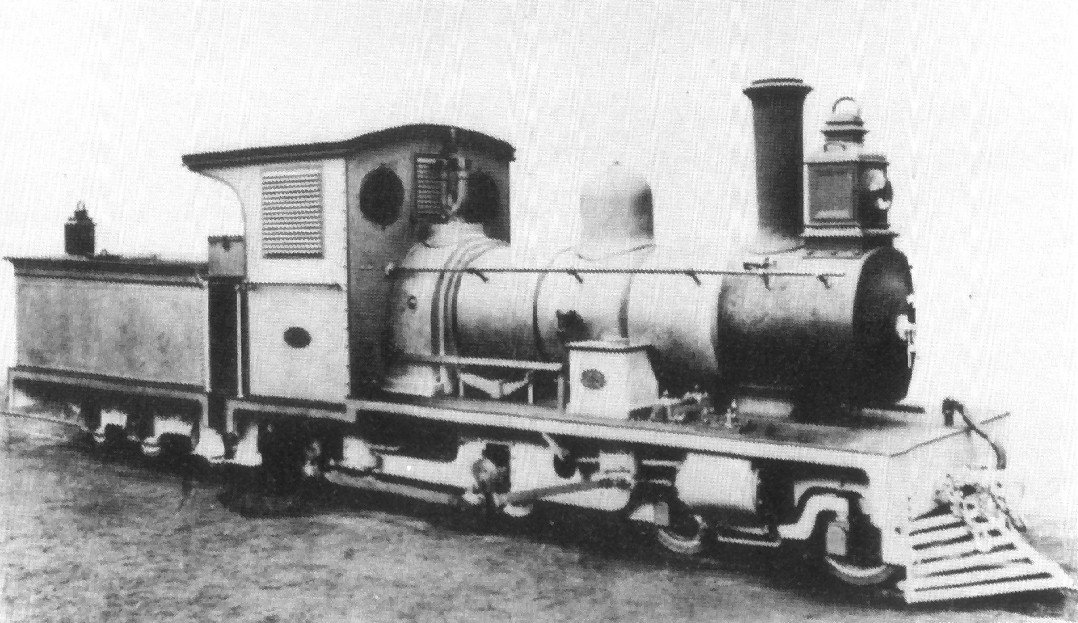
Falcon F4

The next six locomotives which were ordered from Falcon in 1896, were of an altered design. The Falcon F4 was larger and heavier than the F2, with the running boards stepped down below the cab, a larger tube heating surface in the boiler, single slidebars, straight lipped funnels, Ramsbottom safety valves over the fireboxes, and a tractive effort which was increased from the 3,000 pounds-force (13 kilonewtons) at 75% of boiler pressure of the F2 to 3,987 pounds-force (18 kilonewtons). They were numbered in the range from BR10 to BR15 and could pull 180 long tons (183 tonnes) up the ruling gradients, compared to the 160 long tons (163 tonnes) which the F2 could manage.

At the end of 1896, another four of these engines were delivered from Falcon, numbered in the range from BR16 to BR19. They were similar to the previous batches, but had larger three-axle tenders with an increased water capacity.

The last sixteen Falcon-built locomotives were all delivered in 1897, numbered in the range from BR20 to BR35. All these Falcon-built F2 and F4 locomotives bore their engine numbers on the sandboxes on their running boards, in the form of individual brass letters and numbers.

=== Glasgow F4 ===
The construction of the last batch of ten F4 locomotives was subcontracted by Falcon to the Glasgow Railway Engineering Company in Scotland. They were built and delivered in 1898, numbered in the range from BR36 to BR45. The Glasgow locomotives had wasp-waisted safety valves and their engine numbers, also mounted on the sandboxes, were cast oval brass plates.

The manufacturing company in Glasgow was formed by Dugald Drummond in 1891, as Dugald Drummond and Sons. In 1895, when Dugald left to take up the post as locomotive engineer of the London and South Western Railway, the name of the business was changed to the Glasgow Railway Engineering Company, with his sons continuing to manage the works. While the earlier locomotives were known as the Falcon F2 and Falcon F4, this last batch of Glasgow-built locomotives were often referred to as the Drummond F4, in spite of its builder's name change.

=== Fowler tenders ===
In addition to the three-axle tenders which were delivered with all the F2 and F4 locomotives, two larger bogie tenders were ordered from John Fowler and Company of Leeds. One of these was attached to no. BR5 after its three-axle tender was wrecked in an accident. Both these bogie tenders later turned up in South Africa, attached to numbers BR6 and BR8.

== Service ==
=== Beira Railway ===
In service, it turned out that the Lawleys were not adequate to the task. Since rapid growth in traffic soon overwhelmed the narrow-gauge line, it was widened to Cape gauge by 1900. As a result, the whole Lawley locomotive fleet, together with the rest of the Beira Railway's narrow-gauge locomotives, were staged at Bamboo Creek (Villa Machado) near Beira, with the exception of those locomotives which were required for the Ayrshire Railway which was still under construction at the time.

=== Ayrshire Railway ===
The Ayrshire Railway used much of the redundant Beira Railway equipment, including six of the F4 locomotives, one of them Falcon-built and the other five Glasgow-built. They remained in service there until this line was also converted to Cape gauge in 1914 and became the Sinoia branch of the Beira, Mashonaland and Rhodesia Railway.

=== Union Defence Force ===
During the First World War, when South African forces conducted a campaign to drive German forces from Deutsch-Südwest-Afrika (DSWA), narrow-gauge locomotives were urgently required on the Otavi Railway in that territory to replace those which were destroyed by the retreating German forces. Several South African Railways (SAR) locomotives from the various narrow-gauge lines were therefore commandeered by the Union Defence Forces (UDF). To replace these, thirteen of the Lawleys in staging at Bamboo Creek were purchased by the South African Department of Defence and brought to South Africa in 1915. They were renumbered in the range from NG96 to NG108 and, after being repaired, nine of them were placed in service while the other four were cannibalised for spare parts.

- Numbers NG96, NG97 and NG98 were placed in service on the Hopefield line from Kalbaskraal to Saldanha.
- Numbers NG101, NG102 and NG103 were placed in service on the Langkloof line from Port Elizabeth to Avontuur.
- Numbers NG104, NG105 and NG106 were placed in service on the various Natal branches.

As the DSWA campaign drew to a close and many of the ex-German narrow-gauge locomotives were repaired, the SAR locomotives on active service gradually returned to their home lines in South Africa. As a result, the Lawleys were staged once again after less than two years of service in South Africa.

=== South African Railways ===
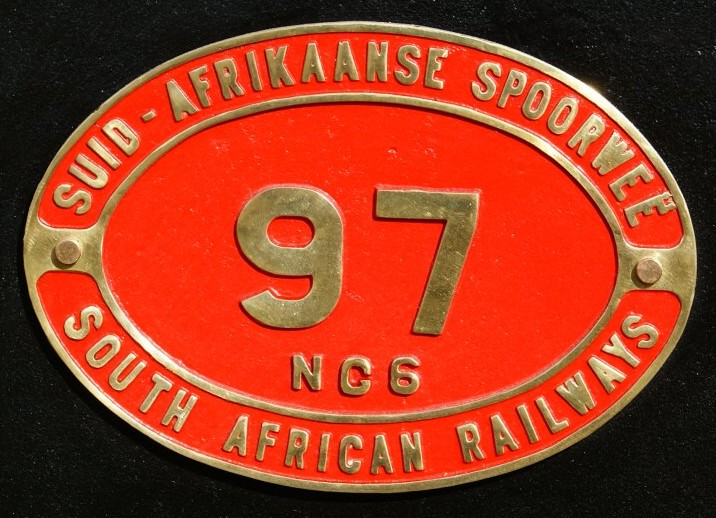

In 1921, Lawley numbers NG101 and NG102 were re-commissioned and placed in SAR service on the branchline from Pienaarsrivier to Pankop, off the mainline between Pretoria and Pietersburg. The Lawleys were the smallest tender steam locomotives to ever see service on the SAR. They performed quite well on this line, since the branch was a light railway with slow speeds and small rolling stock.

During 1924, construction commenced on the narrow-gauge branchline between Upington and Kakamas in the Northern Cape Province and, during 1925, on the branch from Fort Beaufort to Seymour in the Eastern Cape. The remaining Lawleys were then also recovered from storage and placed in service once again. They remained in service when these branchlines were opened to traffic, even though it was usually only in a standby capacity.

Also in 1924, Lawley no. NG98 joined the Dutton road-rail tractors on the narrow-gauge line from Naboomspruit to Singlewood. By 1927, it was joined by no. NG103, but by this time the Singlewood branch was being regauged to Cape gauge and, by 11 June 1928, it was extended to Zebediela.

The system of grouping narrow-gauge locomotives into classes was adopted by the SAR somewhere between 1928 and 1930 and, at that point, the Lawley locomotives were designated Class NG6. The steady increase in loads on the narrow-gauge branches eventually once again proved to be more than the Lawleys were capable of and they were eventually withdrawn. The last one, no. NG103, was retired in 1935.

=== Industrial ===
Several Lawleys were sold into private use with some surviving in service until 1957, often being sold or resold between users. Known users were, amongst others, Premier Portland Cement in Bulawayo, the Rhodesian Native Timber Concessions at Gwaai, the Cam and Motor Mine at Gatooma, the Selukwe Peak Light Railway of the Selukwe Chrome Mine, the Lupane Forest Estates, the Igusi Saw Mills and the Arcturus Mine east of Salisbury, all these in Rhodesia. In South Africa, some went to the Zebediela citrus plantations in the northern Transvaal.

== Works numbers ==
Since frames, boilers and tenders were exchanged between locomotives during the process of building nine serviceable locomotives from the thirteen which were purchased from Bamboo Creek in 1915, the original identities of these locomotives were not always accurately recorded. The Lawley locomotive models, builders and works numbers are listed in the table, which includes the engine numbers of those SAR locomotives of which the Beira Railway engine numbers are known.

Builder	Model	Year built	Works no.	Beira no.	Ayrshire no.	SAR no.
Falcon	F2	1895	230	4		
Falcon	F2	1895	231	5		104
Falcon	F2	1895	232	6		106
Falcon	F2	1895	233	7		
Falcon	F2	1895	234	8		105
Falcon	F2	1895	235	9		
Falcon	F4	1896	242	10		99
Falcon	F4	1896	243	11		
Falcon	F4	1896	244	12		
Falcon	F4	1896	245	13		100
Falcon	F4	1896	246	14		103
Falcon	F4	1896	247	15		
Falcon	F4	1896	254	16		
Falcon	F4	1896	255	17		
Falcon	F4	1896	256	18		
Falcon	F4	1896	257	19		
Falcon	F4	1897	258	20		
Falcon	F4	1897	259	21		
Falcon	F4	1897	260	22		
Falcon	F4	1897	261	23		96
Falcon	F4	1897	262	24		
Falcon	F4	1897	263	25		97
Falcon	F4	1897	264	26		98
Falcon	F4	1897	265	27		
Falcon	F4	1897	266	28		
Falcon	F4	1897	267	29		101
Falcon	F4	1897	268	30	30	
Falcon	F4	1897	269	31		
Falcon	F4	1897	270	32		
Falcon	F4	1897	271	33		102
Falcon	F4	1897	272	34		
Falcon	F4	1897	273	35		
Glasgow	F4	1898		36		
Glasgow	F4	1898		37		
Glasgow	F4	1898		38		
Glasgow	F4	1898		39		
Glasgow	F4	1898		40	40	
Glasgow	F4	1898		41	41	
Glasgow	F4	1898		42	42	
Glasgow	F4	1898		43	43	
Glasgow	F4	1898		44	44	
Glasgow	F4	1898		45		

== Preservation ==
Two locomotives have been restored to running condition at the Sandstone Estates near Ficksburg in the Free State. One is Falcon F2 no. BR7, later SAR no. NG106, which was restored by Sandstone as no. BR7 in the original green Beira Railway livery, while the other is Falcon F4 no. BR25, later SAR no. NG97, which was restored in the black SAR livery.

Two Falcon F4 (27 & 28) are in the Vale of Rheidol Museum Collection.

== Illustration ==
The main picture shows the restored Falcon F2, Beira Railway no. BR6, SAR no. NG106, restored as no. BR7, at Sandstone Estates on 9 April 2006. Those following also illustrate Lawleys in SAR service.

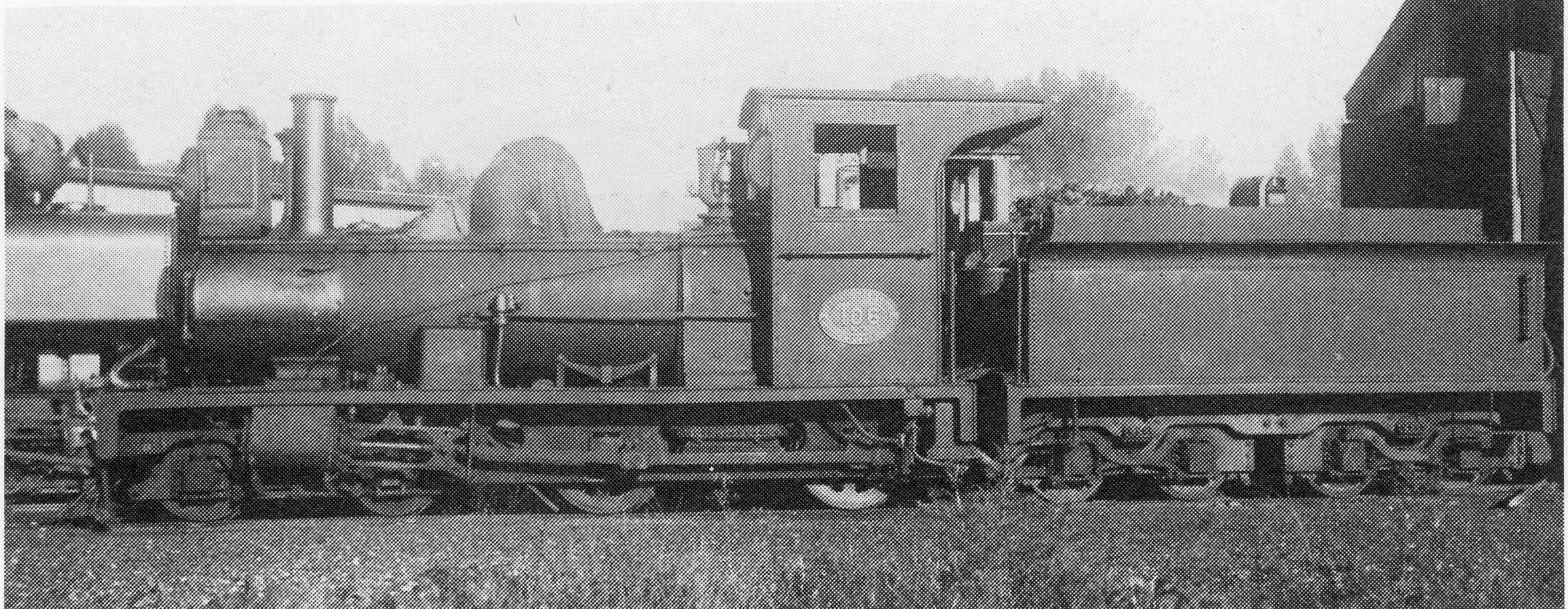
SAR F2 no. NG106, ex no. BR6, with a Fowler tender, Fort Beaufort, c. 1930

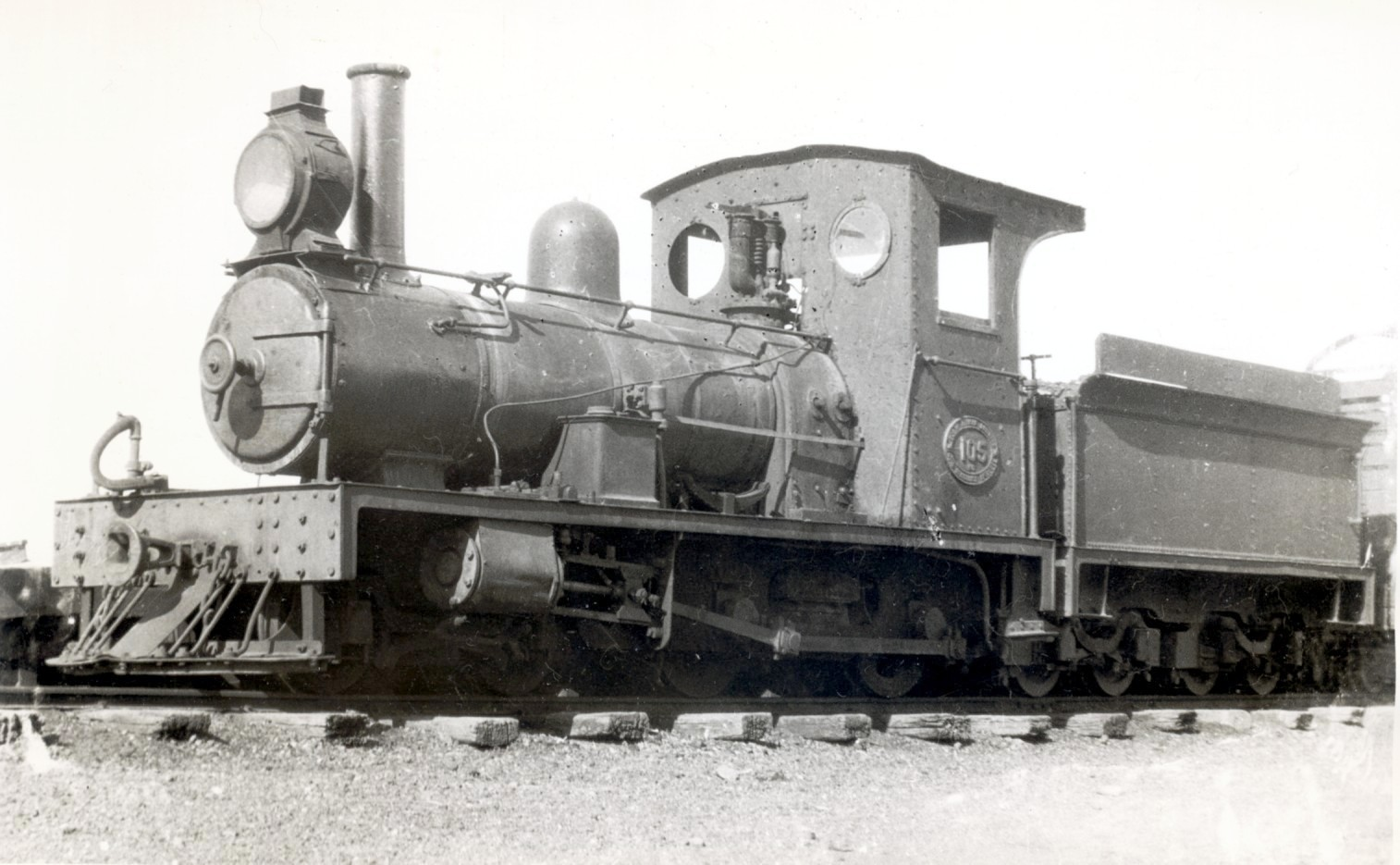
SAR F2 no. NG105, ex no. BR8, with a Fowler tender, Fort Beaufort, c. 1930

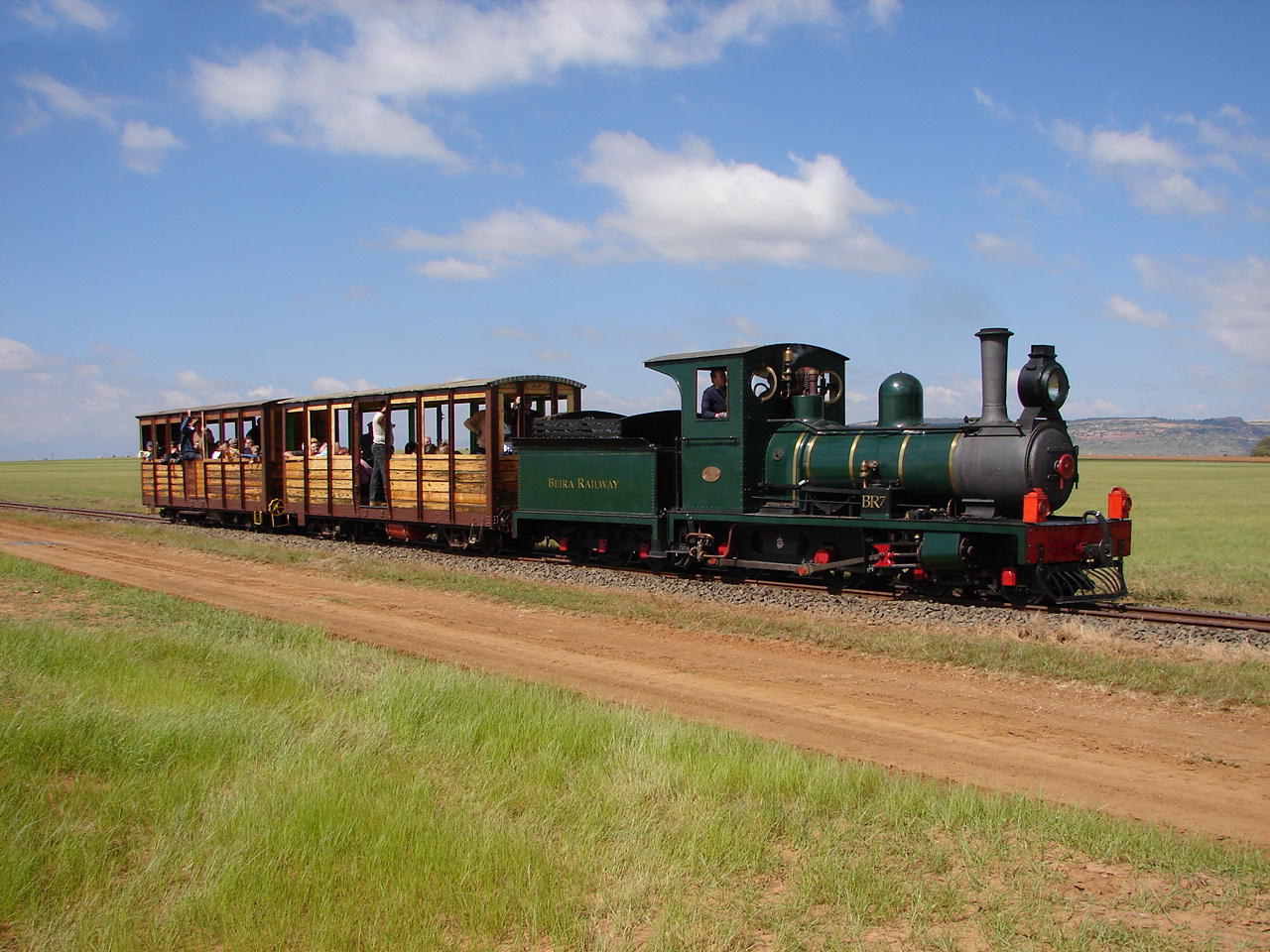
No. BR6, SAR F2 no. NG106, Sandstone Estates, 9 April 2006
