= South Australian Railways D class =

Class of Australian 4-4-0 locomotives

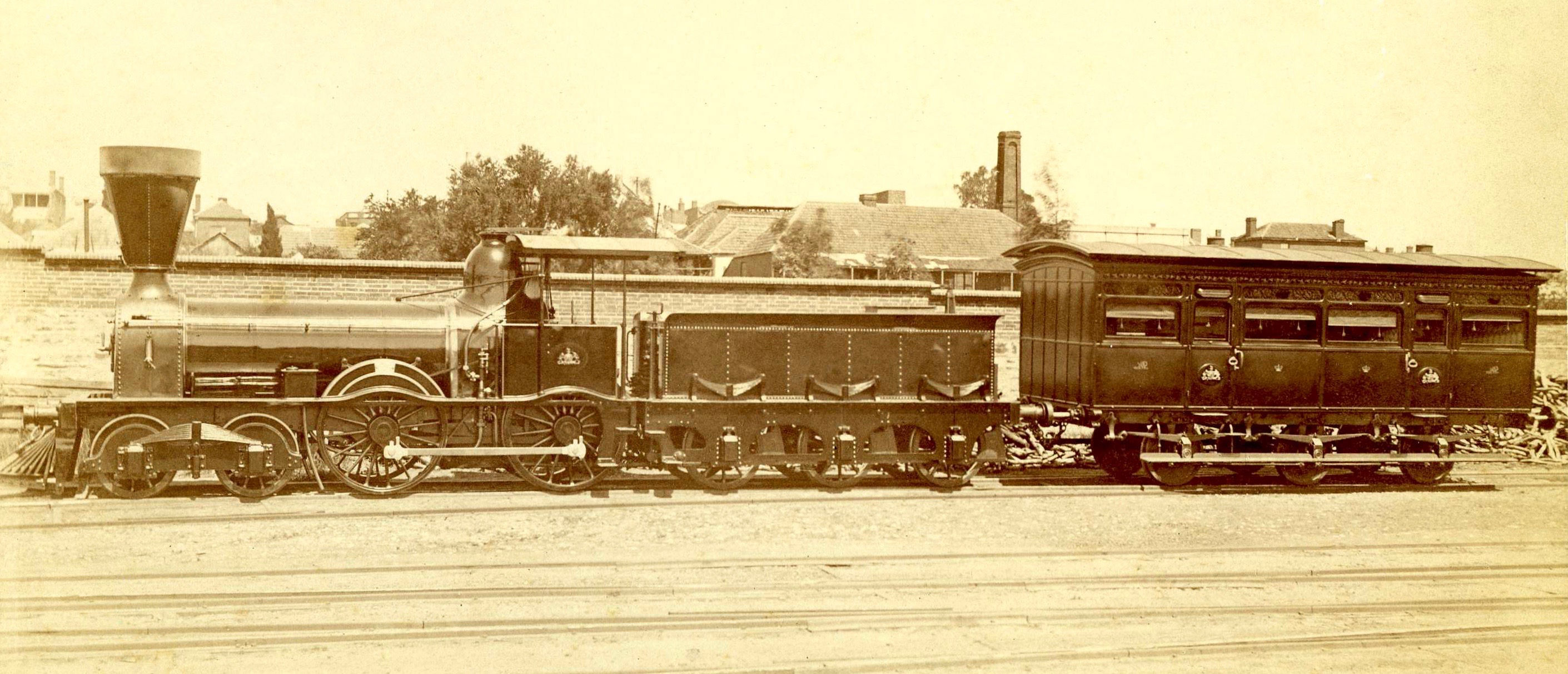
- D class locomotive and the vice-regal car used during the visit of the Duke of Edinburgh in 1867 in Adelaide
Type and origin
- Power type: Steam
- Builder: Robert Stephenson and Company
- Build date: 1859
- Total produced: 8
- Rebuilder: South Australian Railways
- Rebuild date: 1881-1885
Specifications
- Configuration
  - Whyte: 4-4-0 2′B 3
- Gauge: 1,600 mm (5 ft 3 in)
- Driver dia.: 5 ft 4 in (1,626 mm)
- Length: 42 ft 11 1/2 in (13.09 m)
- Total weight: 47 long tons 0 cwt (105,300 lb or 47.8 t)
- Fuel type: Coal
- Fuel capacity: 4 long tons 3 cwt 1 qr (9,320 lb or 4.23 t)
- Water cap.: 1,500 imp gal (1,801 US gal; 6,819 L)
- Firebox
  - Grate area: 14.72 sq ft (1.368 m^{2})
- Boiler pressure: 130 psi (896 kPa)
- Heating surface
  - Firebox: 86 sq ft (8.0 m^{2})
  - Tubes: 864.7 sq ft (80.33 m^{2}); 805 sq ft (74.8 m^{2}) after rebuild
- Cylinders: 2
- Cylinder size: 15.5 in × 22 in (394 mm × 559 mm)
Performance figures
- Tractive effort: 9,125 lbf (40.59 kN) original 8,588 lbf (38.20 kN) approximately
Career
- Operators: South Australian Railways
- Class: D
- Numbers: 8, 9, 11, 12, 15-18
- Withdrawn: 1896-1930
- Scrapped: 1896-1932
- Disposition: All scrapped

The South Australian Railways D class was a class of 4-4-0 steam locomotives operated by the South Australian Railways.

== History ==
In August 1859, Robert Stephenson and Company delivered two 4-4-0 locomotives to the South Australian Railways for use on the Gawler to Kapunda line. A further six were delivered between 1862 and 1867. The first was withdrawn in February 1896, with an additional three withdrawn in 1904. The remaining four were used on construction trains on the Pinnaroo line. They were then used as shunters, with the last withdrawn in November 1932.
