= Cape Government Railways 3rd Class locomotives =

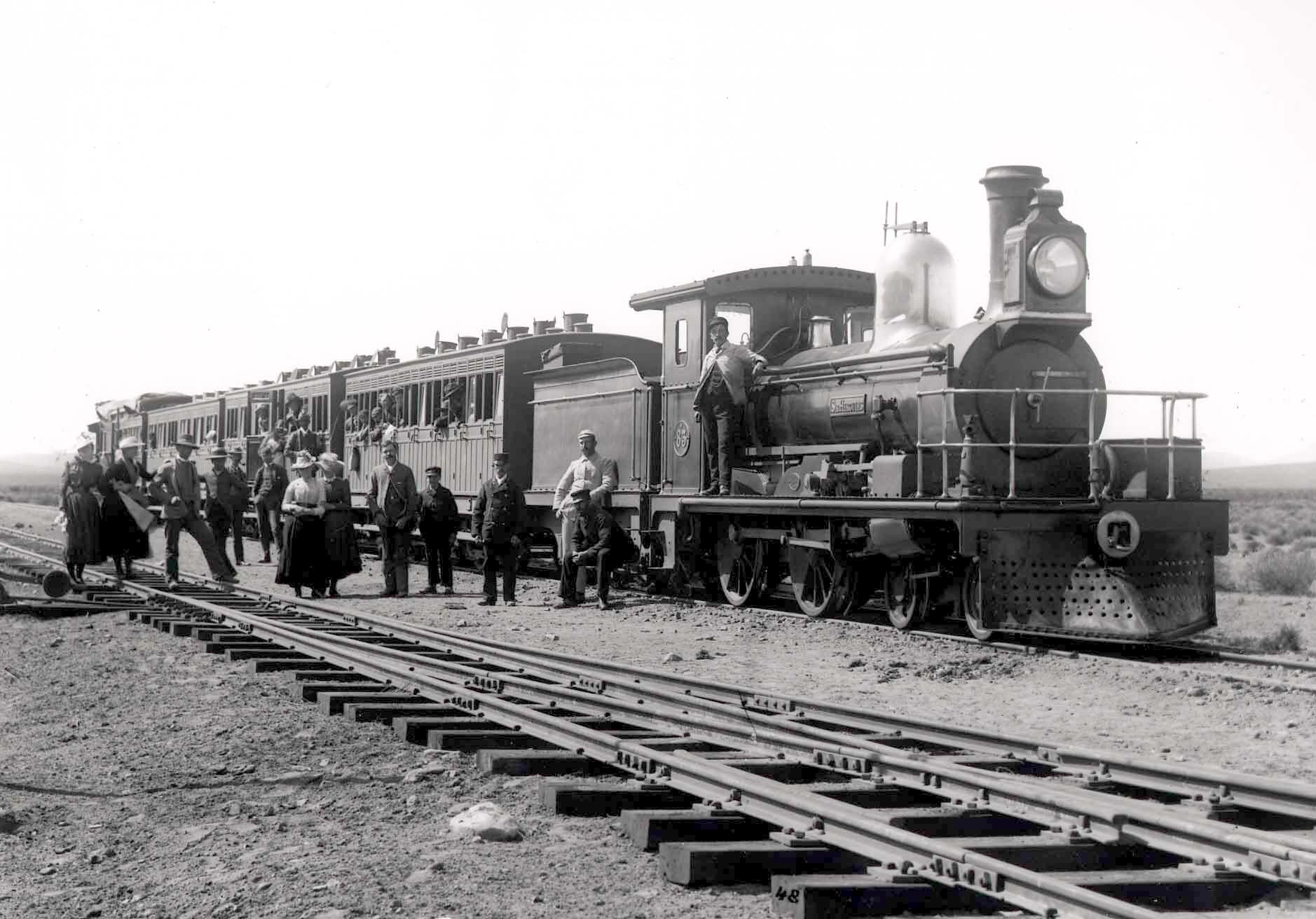
CGR 3rd Class 4-4-0 of 1883

The Cape Government Railways 3rd Class locomotives include seven locomotive types, all designated 3rd Class irrespective of differences in wheel arrangement or configuration.

When the Union of South Africa was established on 31 May 1910, the three Colonial government railways (Cape Government Railways, Natal Government Railways and Central South African Railways) were united under a single administration to control and administer the railways, ports and harbours of the Union. Those of these locomotives which still survived, were considered obsolete and designated Class 03 on the new South African Railways.

2-6-0 wheel arrangement

- CGR 3rd Class 2-6-0T (Tank)

4-4-0 wheel arrangement

The CGR 3rd Class 4-4-0 were built in six batches between 1883 and 1903:

- CGR 3rd Class 4-4-0 1883 (Tender)
- CGR 3rd Class 4-4-0 1884 (Tender, experimental)
- CGR 3rd Class 4-4-0 1889 (Tender)
- CGR 3rd Class 4-4-0 1898 (Tender)
- CGR 3rd Class 4-4-0 1901 (Tender)
- CGR 3rd Class 4-4-0 1903 (Tender)
