= CGR 3rd Class 4-4-0 =

The Cape Government Railways 3rd Class 4-4-0 were a series of South African steam locomotive classes from the pre-Union era in the Cape of Good Hope. Several types were built, identified by their building year:

- CGR 3rd Class 4-4-0 1883
- CGR 3rd Class 4-4-0 1884
- CGR 3rd Class 4-4-0 1889
- CGR 3rd Class 4-4-0 1898
- CGR 3rd Class 4-4-0 1901
- CGR 3rd Class 4-4-0 1903
