= CGR 3rd Class 4-4-0 1898 =

Class of 6 South African 4-4-0 locomotives

CGR 3rd Class 4-4-0 1898 South African Class 03 4-4-0 1898
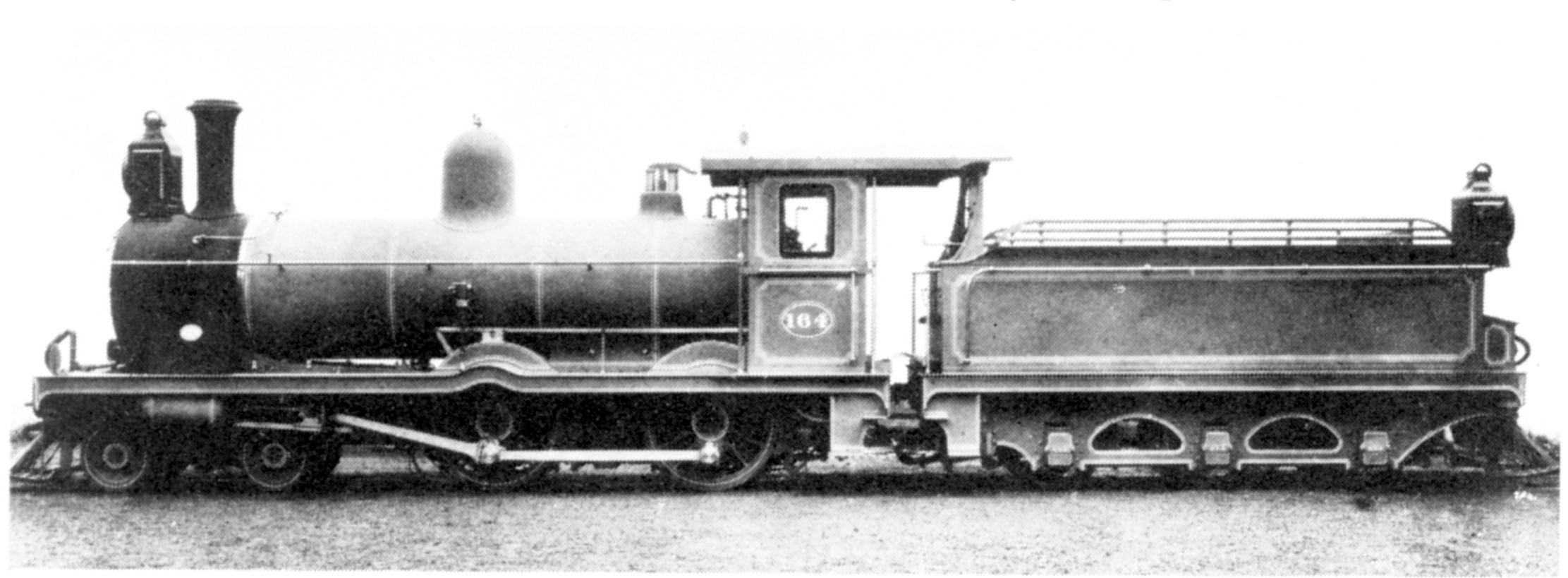
- Works picture of a 3rd Class Wynberg Tender of 1898
Type and origin
- Power type: Steam
- Designer: Cape Government Railways (H.M. Beatty)
- Builder: Neilson and Company
- Serial number: 5282-5287
- Build date: 1898
- Total produced: 6
Specifications
- Configuration
  - Whyte: 4-4-0 (American)
  - UIC: 2'Bn2
- Driver: 1st coupled axle
- Gauge: 3 ft 6 in (1,067 mm) Cape gauge
- Leading dia.: 28 1/2 in (724 mm)
- Coupled dia.: 54 in (1,372 mm)
- Tender wheels: 37 in (940 mm)
- Wheelbase: 39 ft 9 1/8 in (12,119 mm)
  - Engine: 18 ft 8 3/4 in (5,709 mm)
  - Leading: 5 ft 3 in (1,600 mm)
  - Coupled: 7 ft (2,134 mm)
  - Tender: 10 ft (3,048 mm)
- Length
  - Over couplers: 47 ft 10 1/4 in (14,586 mm)
- Height: 12 ft 8 in (3,861 mm)
- Axle load: 12 LT 19 cwt (13,160 kg)
  - Leading: 12 LT 6 cwt (12,500 kg)
  - 1st coupled: 12 LT 17 cwt (13,060 kg)
  - 2nd coupled: 12 LT 19 cwt (13,160 kg)
- Adhesive weight: 25 LT 16 cwt (26,210 kg)
- Loco weight: 38 LT 2 cwt (38,710 kg)
- Tender weight: 28 LT (28,450 kg)
- Total weight: 66 LT 2 cwt (67,160 kg)
- Tender type: 3-axle
- Fuel type: Coal
- Fuel capacity: 4 LT (4.1 t)
- Water cap.: 2,200 imp gal (10,000 L)
- Firebox
  - Type: Round-top
  - Grate area: 15.7 sq ft (1.46 m^{2})
- Boiler
  - Pitch: 6 ft 6 in (1,981 mm)
  - Diameter: 4 ft 1 in (1,245 mm)
  - Tube plates: 10 ft 4 in (3,150 mm)
- Boiler pressure: 160 psi (1,103 kPa)
- Safety valve: Ramsbottom
- Heating surface
  - Firebox: 85.53 sq ft (7.946 m^{2})
  - Tubes: 879.22 sq ft (81.682 m^{2})
  - Total surface: 964.75 sq ft (89.628 m^{2})
- Cylinders: Two
- Cylinder size: 16 in (406 mm) bore 24 in (610 mm) stroke
- Valve gear: Stephenson
- Couplers: Johnston link-and-pin
Performance figures
- Tractive effort: 13,653 lbf (60.73 kN) @ 75%
Career
- Operators: Cape Government Railways; South African Railways
- Class: CGR 3rd Class, SAR Class 03
- Number in class: 6
- Numbers: CGR 12-17, SAR 012-017
- Nicknames: Wynberg Tender
- Delivered: 1898
- First run: 1898
- Withdrawn: c. 1932

The Cape Government Railways 3rd Class 4-4-0 of 1898 was a South African steam locomotive from the pre-Union era in the Cape of Good Hope.

In 1898, the Cape Government Railways placed six 3rd Class Wynberg Tender locomotives with a 4-4-0 American type wheel arrangement in service. They were intended for passenger service on the suburban lines in Cape Town.

== Simon's Town line ==
The original 1864 suburban line from Salt River to Wynberg was extended to Muizenberg in 1882, to Kalkbaai in 1883 and all the way to Simon's Town in 1890.

The resulting increase in suburban traffic led to a requirement for more locomotives, while the additional distance to be covered necessitated the introduction of larger and more powerful locomotives with a larger fuel and water capacity than that of the existing 2nd Class 4-4-0 Wynberg Tanks of 1882.

== Manufacturer ==
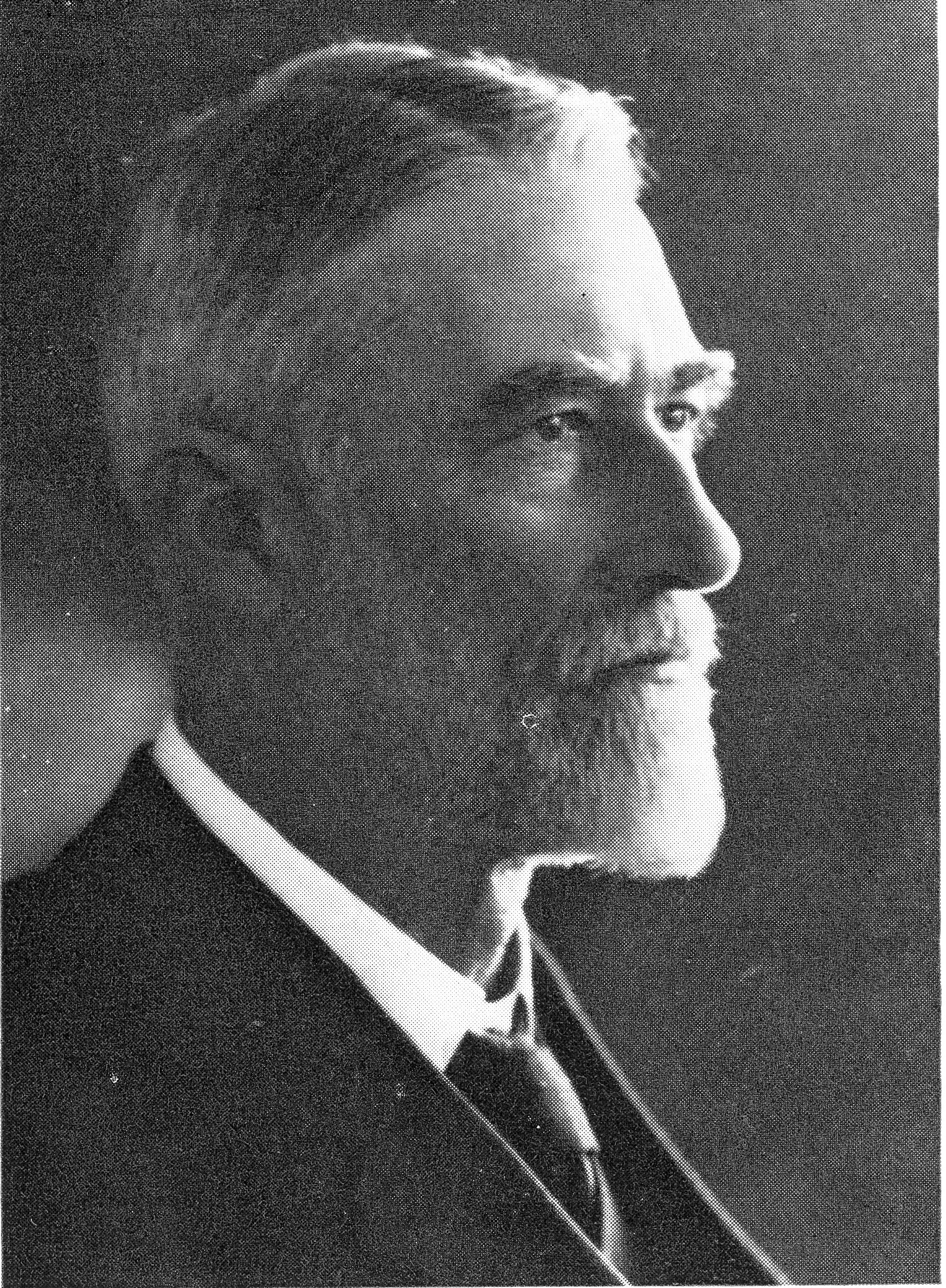
H.M. Beatty

Cape Government Railways (CGR) Chief Locomotive Superintendent Michael Stephens retired in 1895. Shortly after being appointed as his successor in 1896, H.M. Beatty drew up detailed designs for a new 3rd Class passenger locomotive for suburban service in Cape Town.

For his first locomotive design as Chief Locomotive Superintendent, Beatty decided on a larger version of the 3rd Class 4-4-0 which had been introduced on the CGR in 1889. An order for six of these engines was placed with Neilson and Company in Glasgow. The locomotives were delivered in 1898, numbered in the range from 12 to 17.

The locomotives became known as the Wynberg Tenders. They were designed with reverse running in mind, with a weatherboard mounted on the tender front to protect the crew from the elements when running tender first and with a cowcatcher and headlight mounted on the rear end of the tender.

== Service ==
When the Union of South Africa was established on 31 May 1910, the three Colonial government railways (CGR, Natal Government Railways and Central South African Railways) were united under a single administration to control and administer the railways, ports and harbours of the Union. Although the South African Railways and Harbours came into existence in 1910, the actual classification and renumbering of all the rolling stock of the three constituent railways were only implemented with effect from 1 January 1912.

In 1912, the locomotives were considered obsolete by the SAR, designated Class 03 and renumbered by having the numeral "0" prefixed to their existing numbers. In SAR service, they continued to work suburban trains. Two of them, numbers 015 and 016, were scrapped in 1916 but, despite being considered obsolete, the other four survived in service until after 1931.

They remained working on the Simon's Town line until the trains became too heavy for them. They were then used to work the Malmesbury line until they were withdrawn from service.

== Works numbers ==
The works numbers, original numbers and renumbering of the Cape 3rd Class of 1898 are listed in the table.

CGR 3rd Class 4-4-0 of 1898
Works no.	Orig. no.	SAR no.
5282	12	012
5283	13	013
5284	14	014
5285	15	015
5286	16	016
5287	17	017
