= CGR 2nd Class 4-4-0T =

South African steam locomotive

CGR 2nd Class 4-4-0T South African Class 02 4-4-0T
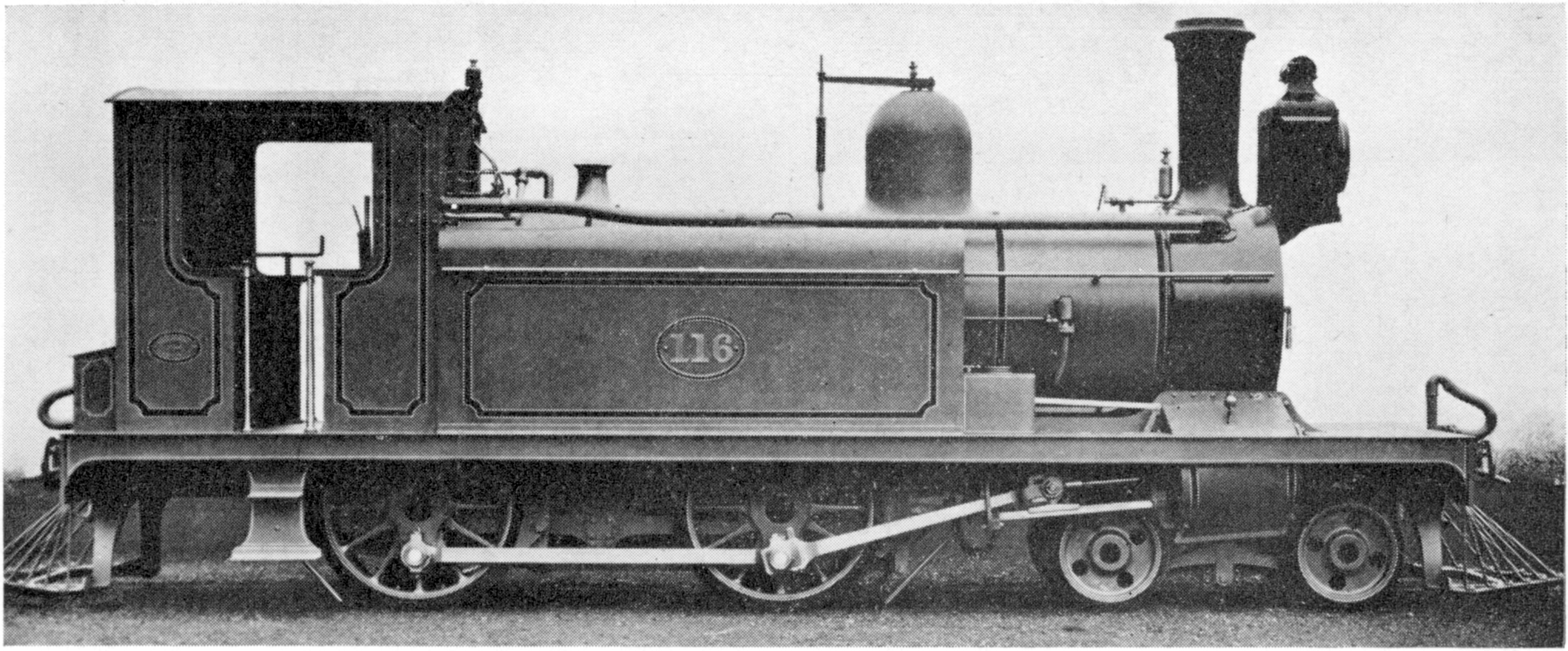
- 2nd Class Wynberg Tank numbered 116
Type and origin
- Power type: Steam
- Designer: Neilson and Company
- Builder: Neilson and Company; Dübs and Company
- Serial number: Neilson 2794-2799, 3876-3877; Dübs 2703-2705
- Build date: 1882-1891
- Total produced: 11
Specifications
- Configuration
  - Whyte: 4-4-0T (American)
  - UIC: 2'Bn2t
- Driver: 1st coupled axle
- Gauge: 3 ft 6 in (1,067 mm) Cape gauge
- Leading dia.: 28 in (711 mm)
- Coupled dia.: 48 1/2 in (1,232 mm) (1882); 49 in (1,245 mm) (1888-1891, & 1882 retyred)
- Wheelbase: 18 ft 1 in (5,512 mm)
  - Leading: 4 ft 8 in (1,422 mm)
  - Coupled: 7 ft (2,134 mm)
- Length
  - Over couplers: 29 ft (8,839 mm)
- Height: 12 ft (3,658 mm)
- Axle load: 12 LT 6 cwt (12,500 kg)
  - Leading: 8 LT 15 cwt 3 qtr (8,929 kg)
  - 1st coupled: 12 LT 6 cwt (12,500 kg)
  - 2nd coupled: 12 LT 3 cwt (12,340 kg)
- Adhesive weight: 24 LT 9 cwt (24,840 kg)
- Loco weight: 33 LT 4 cwt 3 qtr (33,770 kg)
- Fuel type: Coal
- Fuel capacity: 1 1/4 LT (1.3 t)
- Water cap.: 600 imp gal (2,700 L)
- Firebox
  - Type: Round-top
  - Grate area: 10 1/2 sq ft (0.98 m^{2})
- Boiler
  - Pitch: 6 ft 1/2 in (1,842 mm)
  - Diameter: 3 ft 7 in (1,092 mm) outside
  - Tube plates: 8 ft 11 1/2 in (2,730 mm)
  - Small tubes: 135: 1 3/4 in (44 mm)
- Boiler pressure: 130 psi (896 kPa)
- Safety valve: Salter
- Heating surface
  - Firebox: 67 1/2 sq ft (6.27 m^{2})
  - Tubes: 578 1/2 sq ft (53.74 m^{2})
  - Total surface: 646 sq ft (60.0 m^{2})
- Cylinders: Two
- Cylinder size: 15 in (381 mm) bore 22 in (559 mm) stroke
- Valve gear: Stephenson
- Couplers: Johnston link-and-pin
Performance figures
- Tractive effort: 9,400 lbf (42 kN) @ 75%
Career
- Operators: Cape Government Railways; South African Railways
- Class: CGR 2nd Class, SAR Class 02
- Number in class: 11
- Numbers: W89-W94, 27-28, 18-20
- Nicknames: Wynberg Tank
- Delivered: 1882-1891
- First run: 1882

The Cape Government Railways 2nd Class 4-4-0T of 1882 was a South African steam locomotive from the pre-Union era in the Cape of Good Hope.

In 1882, the Cape Government Railways placed six tank locomotives with a 4-4-0 American type wheel arrangement in service on its suburban passenger trains out of Cape Town. Five more of these locomotives, colloquially known as Wynberg Tanks and later officially designated 2nd Class, entered service in 1888 and 1891.

== Manufacturers ==
Since, by 1882, increasing passenger traffic on the Wynberg suburban line in Cape Town demanded higher speeds and more frequent service, an order was placed by the Cape Government Railways (CGR) for four-coupled side-tank locomotives with four-wheeled leading bogies. Six 4-4-0T locomotives were built by Neilson and Company in 1882, numbered in the range from W89 to W94 in the Western System's number range. They entered service on suburban passenger trains, working out of Cape Town to the southern suburbs. Two more, numbered 27 and 28, were delivered from the same builders in 1888 and another three, numbered in the range from 18 to 20, from Dübs and Company in 1891.

== Wynberg Tanks ==
At the time, the southern suburban line ran to a terminus at Wynberg and the locomotives therefore became colloquially known as the Wynberg Tanks. Their official CGR classification was as 2nd Class, in spite of the fact that they were of a different wheel arrangement and configuration than existing Cape locomotives with the same class designation, the 2-6-2 tank-and-tender 2nd Class of 1875.

== Characteristics ==
The first six locomotives were delivered with coupled wheels of 48 1/2 inches (1,232 millimetres) diameter, but the diameter was subsequently increased to 49 inches (1,245 millimetres) when the wheels were retyred. The two batches of 1888 and 1891 were delivered with the larger diameter driving wheels.

The feedwater pump was fitted to the front frame stretcher and was backed up by a small emergency injector feed, attached to the outside of the engine frame on the fireman's side.

The locomotive was designed to operate in both directions and was therefore provided with a large enclosed cab to afford greater protection from the elements when travelling bunker forward. This, and the fact that the locomotives performed well, made them popular with the enginemen. The CGR general manager's report for 1889 mentioned that locomotive no. 27, which had been placed in service in March 1888, had worked continuously on the heaviest and fastest trains in the Cape and had run 58,123 miles (93,540 kilometres) during the year in question, before being taken out of service to have worn tyres replaced.

== Service ==
=== Cape Government Railways ===
The first batch of locomotives was renumbered by 1887 and again in 1888, when the CGR adopted new locomotive numbering systems. In addition to the known numbering and renumbering, there appears to have been an intermediate CGR numbering system at some stage between 1884 and the renumbering of the late 1880s. Apart from photographic evidence, no information about this numbering system has been found as yet. An example is the builder's picture of a Wynberg Tank, possibly no. W93, bearing the number 116 which does not fit in with any of the known numbers of these locomotives.

After the Metropolitan and Suburban Railway Company went into liquidation on 19 July 1897, operations on its short railway from the city to Sea Point were taken over by the Cape government. After considerable alterations and improvements, the line was reopened by the CGR in December 1905 and two of the Wynberg Tanks were allocated to the Sea Point section. The locomotives remained on suburban passenger service on the Wynberg and Sea Point lines until the increasing loads became too heavy for them to handle. They were then placed in shunting service and also hauled the lighter passenger trains on the Milnerton branchline.

=== South African Railways ===
When the Union of South Africa was established on 31 May 1910, the three Colonial government railways, the CGR, the Natal Government Railways and the Central South African Railways, were united under a single administration to control and administer the railways, ports and harbours of the Union. Although the South African Railways and Harbours came into existence in 1910, the actual classification and renumbering of all the rolling stock of the three constituent railways was only implemented with effect from 1 January 1912.

With the exception of no. W89-93-21, which had been scrapped at some time between 1888 and 1891, all these locomotives were still in service in 1912. Since the SAR considered them obsolete, they were renumbered by having a "0" prefix added to their existing numbers. They were classified as Class 02 on the SAR and remained in service until 1916, when they were withdrawn.

== Works numbers and renumbering ==
The builders, works numbers, years built, original numbers and renumbering of the Cape 2nd Class of 1882 are listed in the table.

CGR 2nd Class 4-4-0T Wynberg Tank
Builder	Works no.	Year built	1882 no.	1887 no.	1888 no.	1891 no.	1912 no.
Neilson	2794	1882	W89	93	21		
Neilson	2795	1882	W90	94	22	22	022
Neilson	2796	1882	W91	95	23	23	023
Neilson	2797	1882	W92	96	24	24	024
Neilson	2798	1882	W93	97	25	25	025
Neilson	2799	1882	W94	98	26	26	026
Neilson	3876	1888			27	27	027
Neilson	3877	1888			28	28	028
Dübs	2703	1891				18	018
Dübs	2704	1891				19	019
Dübs	2705	1891				20	020

== Illustration ==
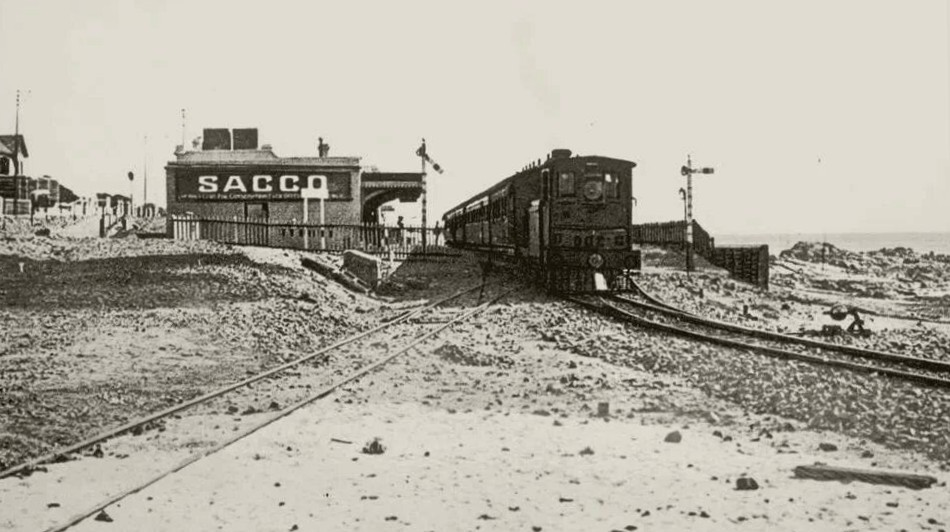
Wynberg Tank at Sea Point Station, bunker forward, c. 1906

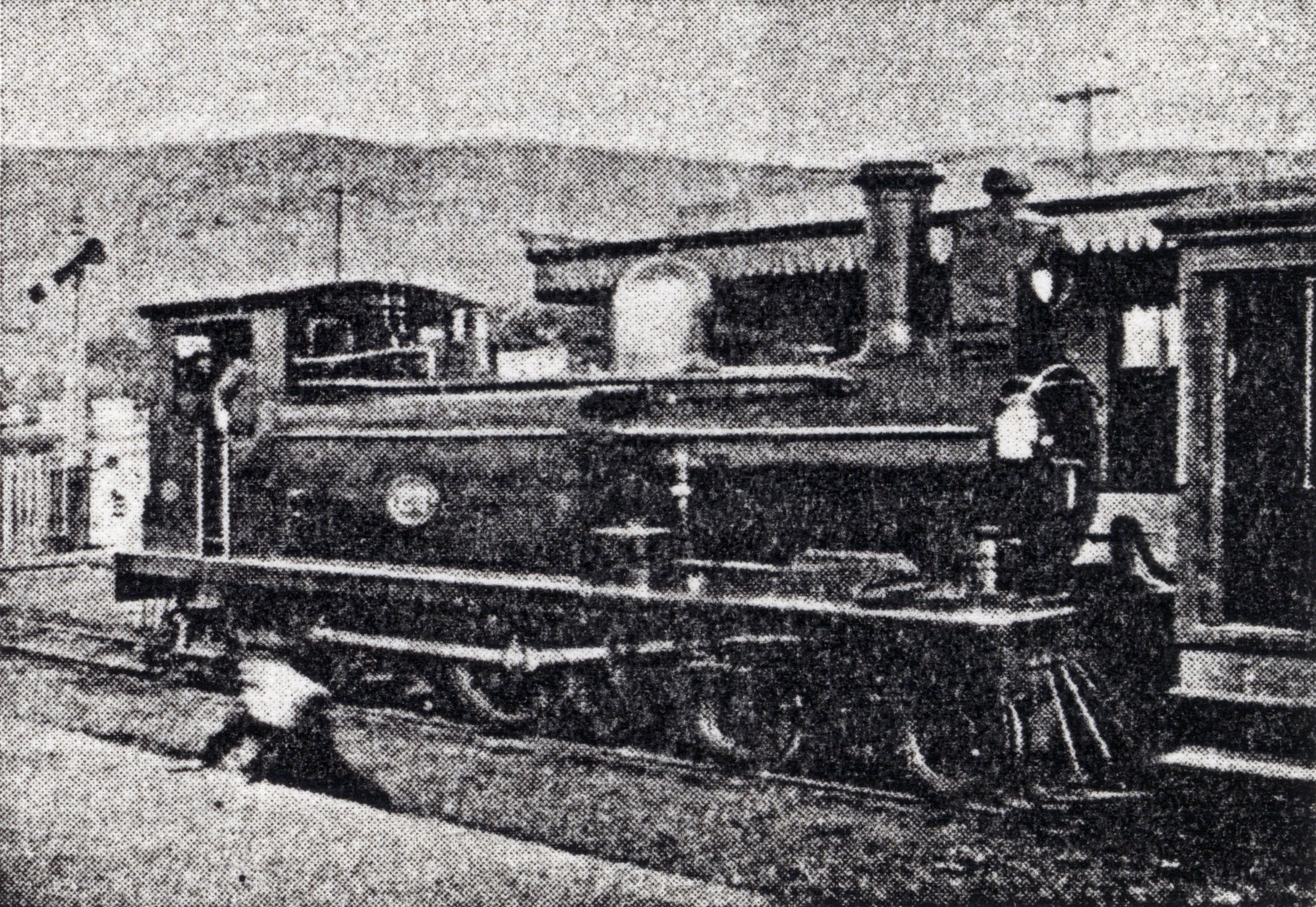
No. 23 on the Sea Point line, c. 1906
