= CGR 3rd Class 4-4-0 1903 =

Class of 8 South African 4-4-0 locomotives

CGR 3rd Class 4-4-0 1903 South African Class 03 4-4-0 1903
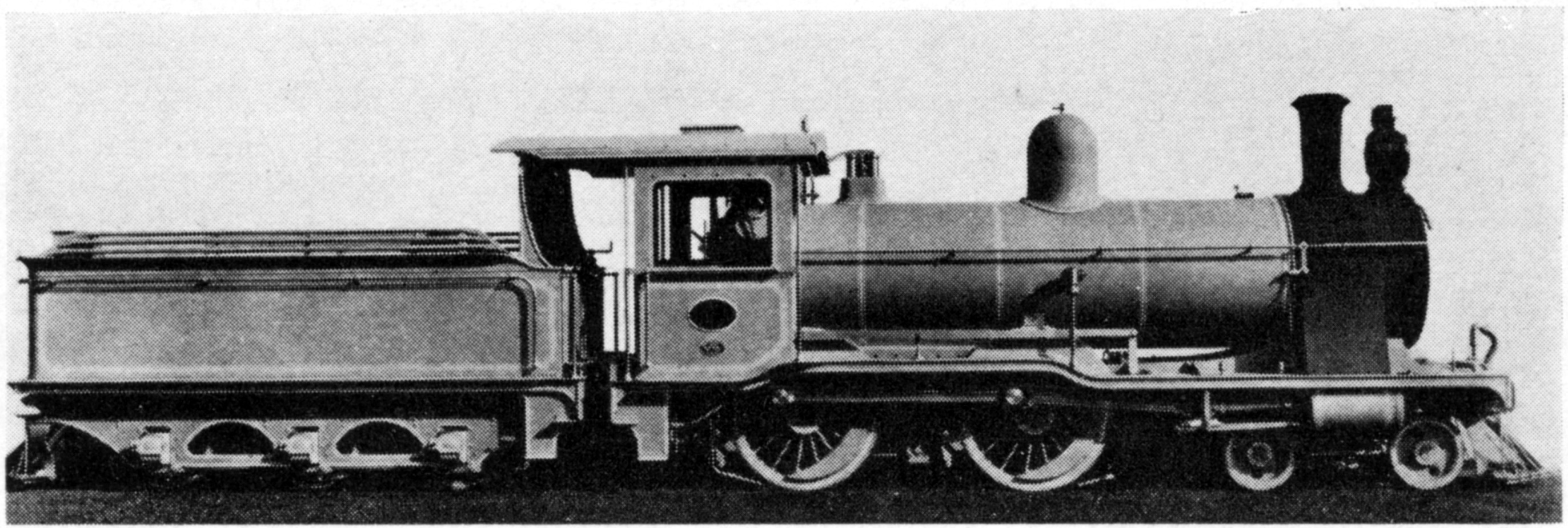
- CGR 3rd Class 4-4-0 of 1903 Wynberg Tender
Type and origin
- Power type: Steam
- Designer: Cape Government Railways (H.M. Beatty)
- Builder: Sharp, Stewart and Company
- Serial number: 4969-4976
- Build date: 1903
- Total produced: 8
Specifications
- Configuration
  - Whyte: 4-4-0 (American)
  - UIC: 2'Bn2
- Driver: 1st coupled axle
- Gauge: 3 ft 6 in (1,067 mm) Cape gauge
- Leading dia.: 28 1/2 in (724 mm)
- Coupled dia.: 60 in (1,524 mm)
- Tender wheels: 37 in (940 mm)
- Wheelbase: 41 ft 5 3/4 in (12,643 mm)
  - Engine: 20 ft 1/2 in (6,109 mm)
  - Leading: 5 ft 3 in (1,600 mm)
  - Coupled: 7 ft 6 in (2,286 mm)
  - Tender: 10 ft (3,048 mm)
- Length
  - Over couplers: 50 ft 2 1/2 in (15,304 mm)
- Height: 12 ft 10 in (3,912 mm)
- Frame type: Plate
- Axle load: 14 LT 15 cwt (14,990 kg)
  - Leading: 12 LT 9 cwt (12,650 kg)
  - 1st coupled: 14 LT 8 cwt (14,630 kg)
  - 2nd coupled: 14 LT 15 cwt (14,990 kg)
  - Tender axle: Axle 1: 10 LT 10 cwt (10,670 kg); Axle 2: 10 LT 6 cwt (10,470 kg); Axle 3: 11 LT 1 cwt (11,230 kg)
- Adhesive weight: 29 LT 3 cwt (29,620 kg)
- Loco weight: 41 LT 12 cwt (42,270 kg)
- Tender weight: 31 LT 7 cwt (31,850 kg)
- Total weight: 72 LT 19 cwt (74,120 kg)
- Tender type: 3-axle
- Fuel type: Coal
- Fuel capacity: 5 LT (5.1 t)
- Water cap.: 2,470 imp gal (11,200 L)
- Firebox
  - Type: Round-top
  - Grate area: 18 sq ft (1.7 m^{2})
- Boiler
  - Pitch: 7 ft (2,134 mm)
  - Diameter: 4 ft 4 in (1,321 mm)
  - Tube plates: 10 ft 3/8 in (3,058 mm)
- Boiler pressure: 180 psi (1,241 kPa)
- Safety valve: Ramsbottom
- Heating surface
  - Firebox: 109 sq ft (10.1 m^{2})
  - Tubes: 910 sq ft (85 m^{2})
  - Total surface: 1,019 sq ft (94.7 m^{2})
- Cylinders: Two
- Cylinder size: 17 1/2 in (444 mm) bore 24 in (610 mm) stroke
- Valve gear: Stephenson
- Couplers: Johnston link-and-pin
Performance figures
- Tractive effort: 16,540 lbf (73.6 kN) @ 75%
Career
- Operators: Cape Government Railways; South African Railways
- Class: CGR 3rd Class, SAR Class 03
- Number in class: 8
- Numbers: 1, 21, 29-30, 45, 48-49, 56
- Nicknames: Wynberg Tender
- Delivered: 1903
- First run: 1903
- Withdrawn: c. 1932

The Cape Government Railways 3rd Class 4-4-0 of 1903 was a South African steam locomotive from the pre-Union era in the Cape of Good Hope.

In 1903, the Cape Government Railways placed the last eight 3rd Class Wynberg Tender locomotives with a 4-4-0 American type wheel arrangement in suburban service in Cape Town. While they appeared to be virtually identical to the locomotives of 1901 at first glance, they were heavier and more powerful.

== Manufacturer ==
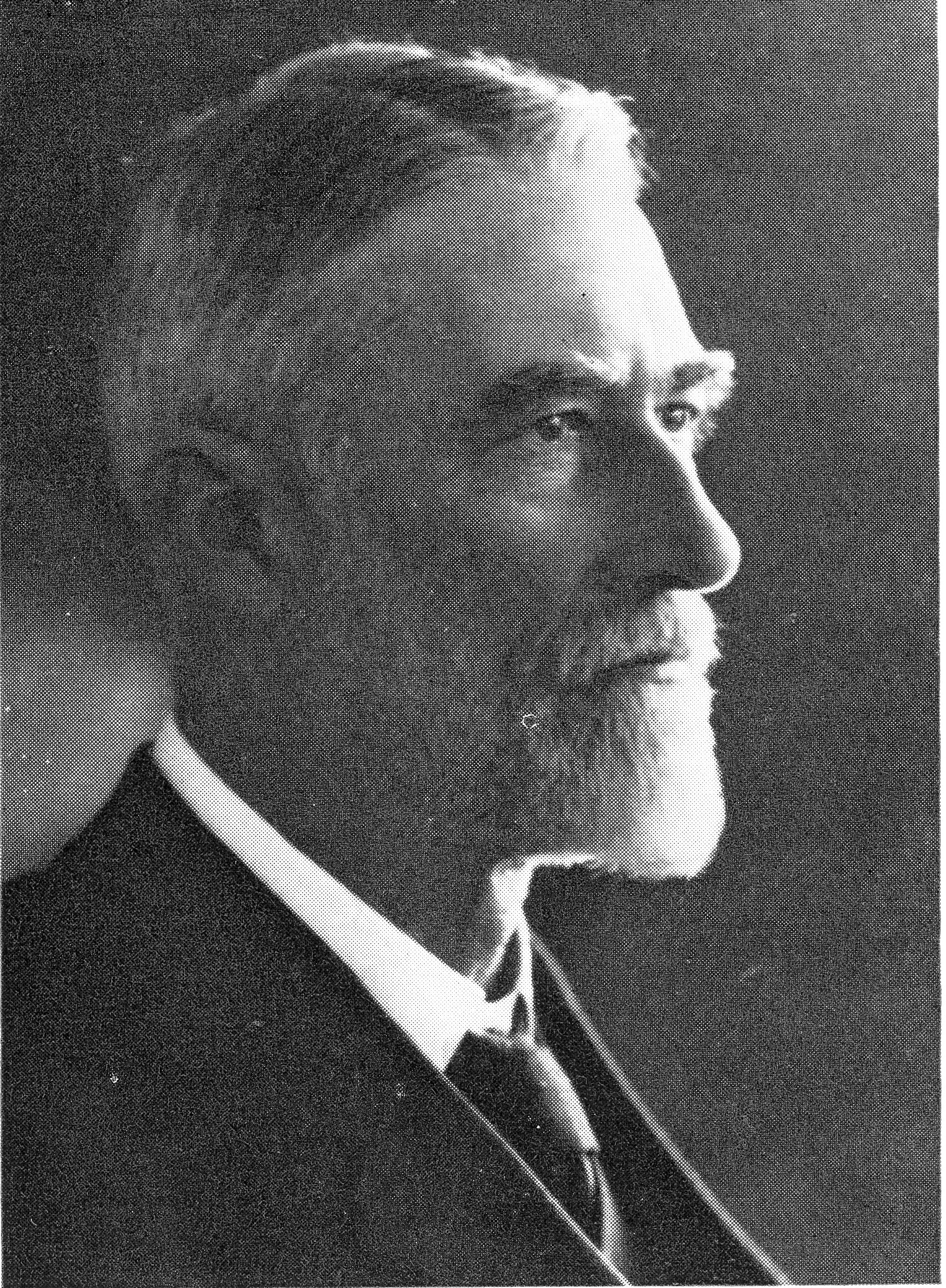
H.M. Beatty

The last eight 3rd Class Wynberg Tender passenger locomotives for suburban service in Cape Town were introduced on the Cape Government Railways (CGR) in 1903. Like the Wynberg Tenders of 1901, they were built by Sharp, Stewart and Company. It would appear that their numbering was used as an opportunity to perform some gap-filling on the CGR engine number roster.

These locomotives were very similar in design and appearance to the six CGR 3rd Class 4-4-0 engines of 1901, but Cape Government Railways Chief Locomotive Superintendent H.M. Beatty had revisited his earlier designs which resulted in a larger and more powerful locomotive. The main differences were:

- The wheelbase of the coupled wheels, the engine itself and the engine-and-tender were longer and, as a result, the overall length was longer.
- The engine and tender were both heavier, with a heavier axle load.
- The tender had a larger water capacity.
- The boiler pitch was raised.
- The maximum boiler pressure was raised from 165 to 180 pounds per square inch (1,138 to 1,241 kilopascals).
- The grate area and the tube and firebox heating areas were larger.
- The cylinder bore was increased and, as a result, the tractive effort was increased from 14,310 to 16,540 pounds-force (63.7 to 73.6 kilonewtons) at 75% boiler pressure.

== Service ==
=== Cape Government Railways ===
These locomotives were also known as Wynberg Tenders. They were fast and reliable and performed well on the Simon's Town line. Some were later transferred to Port Elizabeth, where they were employed on the inter-urban passenger trains to Uitenhage.

=== South African Railways ===
When the Union of South Africa was established on 31 May 1910, the three Colonial government railways (CGR, Natal Government Railways and Central South African Railways) were united under a single administration to control and administer the railways, ports and harbours of the Union. Although the South African Railways and Harbours came into existence in 1910, the actual classification and renumbering of all the rolling stock of the three constituent railways were only implemented with effect from 1 January 1912.

In 1912, even though they were less than ten years old, these locomotives were also considered obsolete by the South African Railways (SAR), designated Class 03 and renumbered by having the numeral "0" prefixed to their existing numbers. In SAR service, they continued to work suburban trains in Cape Town. Some were later transferred to Germiston, where they were adapted to work the push-pull railmotor trains which ran between Germiston and Wattles until that line was electrified.

Despite being considered obsolete, all eight engines survived until c. 1918. Two were withdrawn from service between 1918 and 1931, while the rest survived in service until after 1931.

== Works numbers ==
The works numbers, original numbers and renumbering of the Cape 3rd Class of 1903 are shown in the table.

CGR 3rd Class 4-4-0 of 1903
Works no.	Orig. no.	SAR no.
4969	1	01
4970	21	021
4971	29	029
4972	30	030
4973	45	045
4974	48	048
4975	49	049
4976	56	056

== Illustration ==
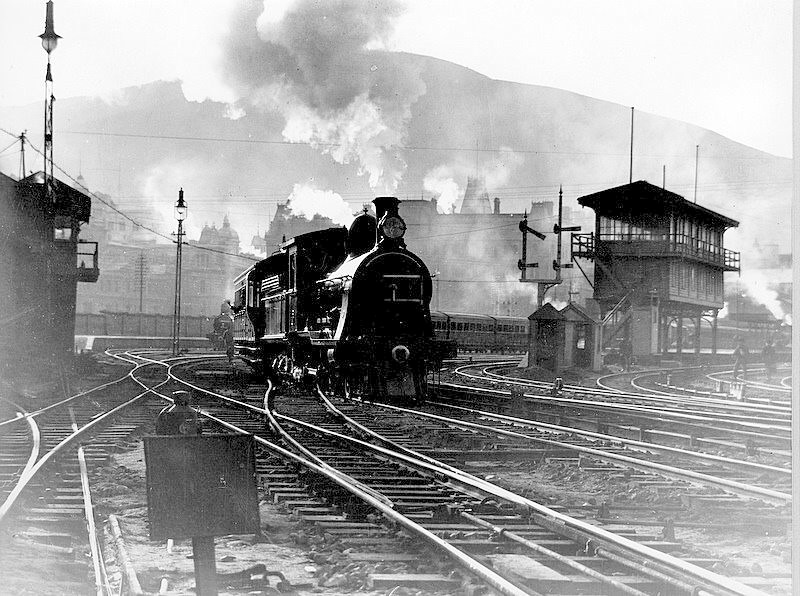
3rd Class Wynberg Tender leaving Cape Town Station, c. 1907

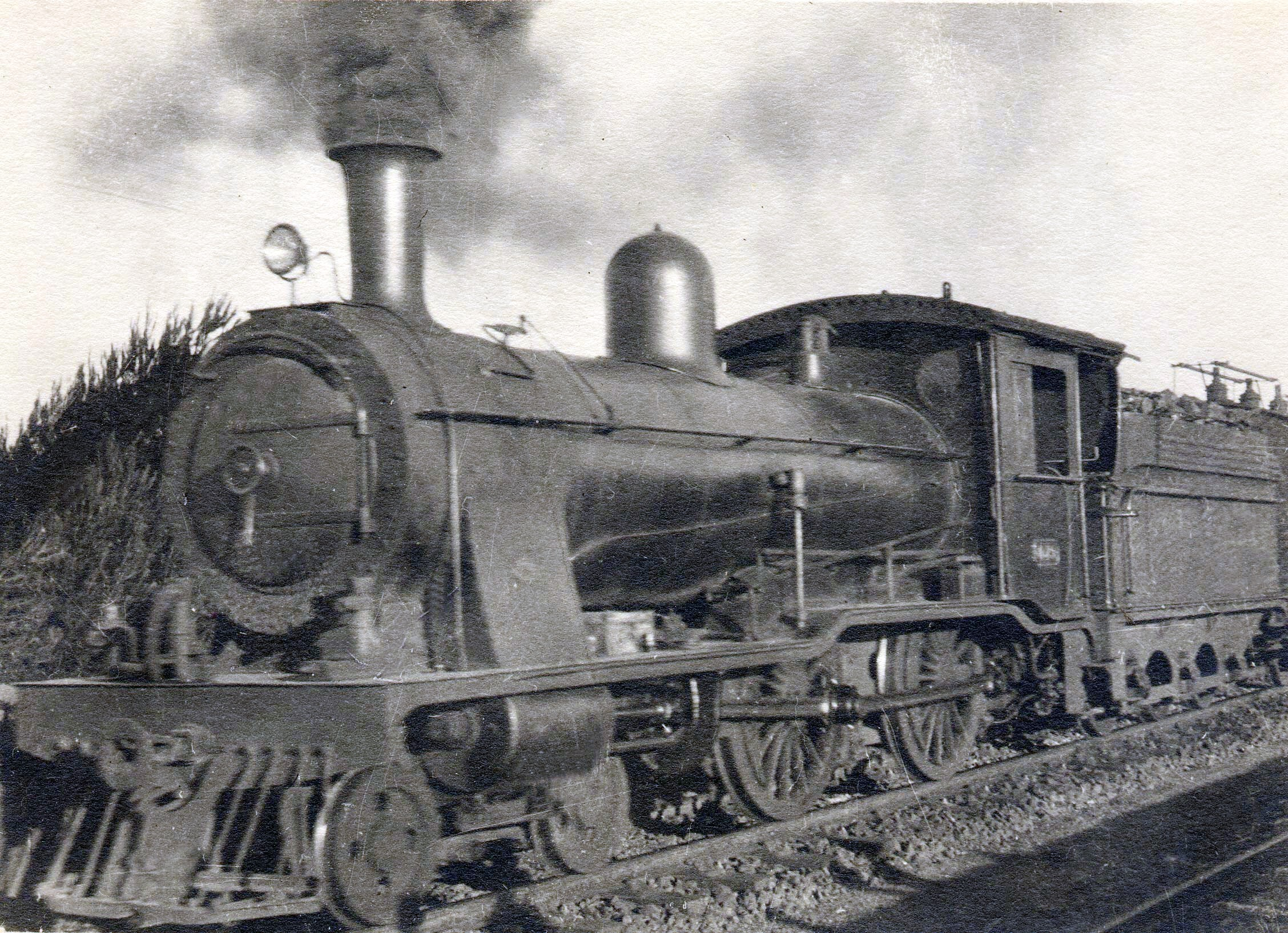
No. 49 on a motor train between Germiston and Wattles, c. 1930
