= CGR 3rd Class 4-4-0 1901 =

Type of steam locomotive

CGR 3rd Class 4-4-0 1901 South African Class 03 4-4-0 1901
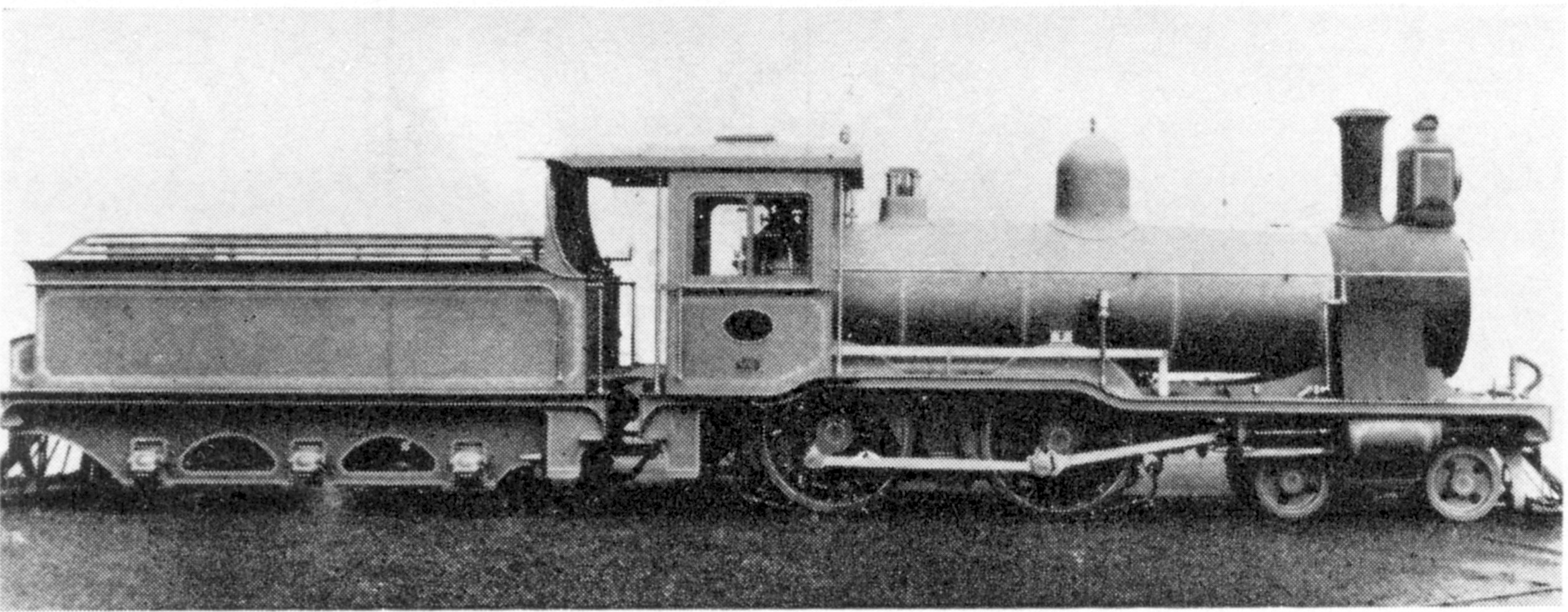
- CGR 3rd Class 4-4-0 of 1901 Wynberg Tender
Type and origin
- Power type: Steam
- Designer: Cape Government Railways (H.M. Beatty)
- Builder: Sharp, Stewart and Company
- Serial number: 4710-4715
- Build date: 1901
- Total produced: 6
Specifications
- Configuration
  - Whyte: 4-4-0 (American)
  - UIC: 2'Bn2
- Driver: 1st coupled axle
- Gauge: 3 ft 6 in (1,067 mm) Cape gauge
- Leading dia.: 28 1/2 in (724 mm)
- Coupled dia.: 60 in (1,524 mm)
- Tender wheels: 37 in (940 mm)
- Wheelbase: 40 ft 7 3/4 in (12,389 mm)
  - Engine: 19 ft 6 1/8 in (5,947 mm)
  - Leading: 5 ft 3 in (1,600 mm)
  - Coupled: 7 ft (2,134 mm)
  - Tender: 10 ft (3,048 mm)
- Length
  - Over couplers: 49 ft 9 in (15,164 mm)
- Height: 12 ft 10 in (3,912 mm)
- Frame type: Plate
- Axle load: 14 LT (14,220 kg)
  - Leading: 12 LT (12,190 kg)
  - Coupled: 14 LT (14,220 kg)
  - Tender axle: Axle 1: 10 LT 16 cwt (10,970 kg); Axle 2: 8 LT 14 cwt (8,840 kg); Axle 3: 10 LT 13 cwt (10,820 kg)
- Adhesive weight: 28 LT (28,450 kg)
- Loco weight: 40 LT (40,640 kg)
- Tender weight: 30 LT 3 cwt (30,630 kg)
- Total weight: 70 LT 3 cwt (71,280 kg)
- Tender type: 3-axle
- Fuel type: Coal
- Fuel capacity: 5 LT (5.1 t)
- Water cap.: 2,350 imp gal (10,700 L)
- Firebox
  - Type: Round-top
  - Grate area: 16.8 sq ft (1.56 m^{2})
- Boiler
  - Pitch: 6 ft 9 in (2,057 mm)
  - Diameter: 4 ft 2 5/8 in (1,286 mm)
  - Tube plates: 10 ft 3/8 in (3,058 mm)
- Boiler pressure: 165 psi (1,138 kPa)
- Safety valve: Ramsbottom
- Heating surface
  - Firebox: 92 sq ft (8.5 m^{2})
  - Tubes: 850 sq ft (79 m^{2})
  - Total surface: 942 sq ft (87.5 m^{2})
- Cylinders: Two
- Cylinder size: 17 in (432 mm) bore 24 in (610 mm) stroke
- Valve gear: Stephenson
- Couplers: Johnston link-and-pin
Performance figures
- Tractive effort: 14,310 lbf (63.7 kN) @ 75%
Career
- Operators: Cape Government Railways; South African Railways
- Class: CGR 3rd Class, SAR Class 03
- Number in class: 6
- Numbers: 6-11
- Nicknames: Wynberg Tender
- Delivered: 1901
- First run: 1901
- Withdrawn: c. 1932

The Cape Government Railways 3rd Class 4-4-0 of 1901 was a South African steam locomotive from the pre-Union era in the Cape of Good Hope.

In 1901, the Cape Government Railways placed another six 3rd Class Wynberg Tender locomotives with a 4-4-0 American type wheel arrangement in suburban service in Cape Town. It was a heavier and more powerful version of the 3rd Class locomotive of 1898.

== Manufacturer ==
Six more 3rd Class Wynberg Tender passenger locomotives entered service on the Cape Government Railways (CGR) in 1901 for suburban service in Cape Town. They were built by Sharp, Stewart and Company and numbered in the range from 6 to 11.

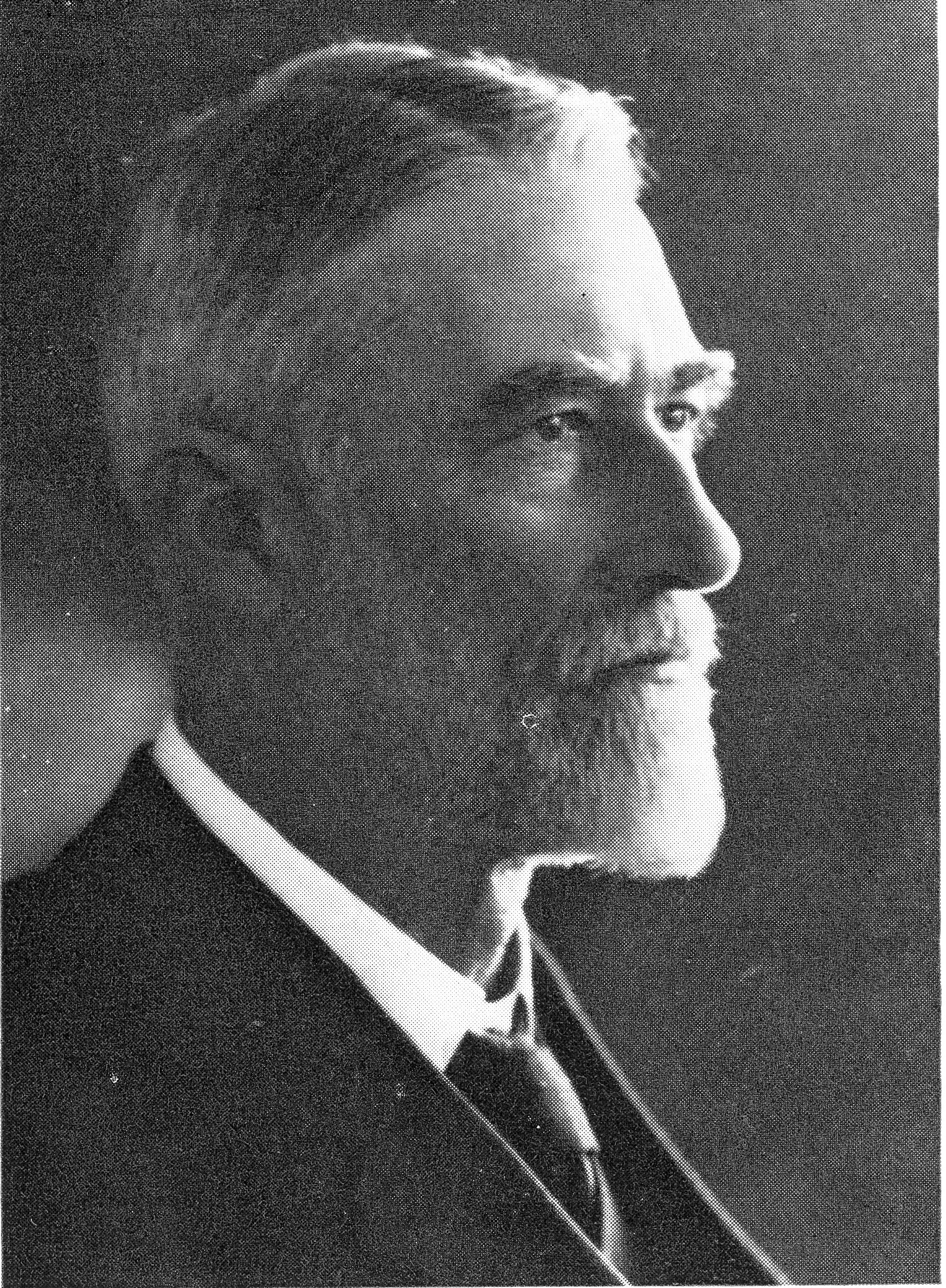
H.M. Beatty

Also designed by H.M. Beatty, these locomotives were very similar in design to the 3rd Class 4-4-0 of 1898, but larger and more powerful. They were built for speed and had the largest coupled wheels of any locomotive on the CGR to date, at 60 inches (1,524 millimetres) diameter.

In later years, this driving wheel size became the accepted size for mixed traffic and general purpose locomotives on mainline service in South Africa. During the rest of the steam era in South Africa, only four locomotive types were to be introduced with larger driving wheels, post-delivery modifications excluded.

== Service ==
=== Cape Government Railways ===
These locomotives were also known as Wynberg Tenders. They were also designed with reverse running in mind, with a weatherboard mounted on the six-wheeled tender's front to protect the crew from the elements when running tender first.

=== South African Railways ===
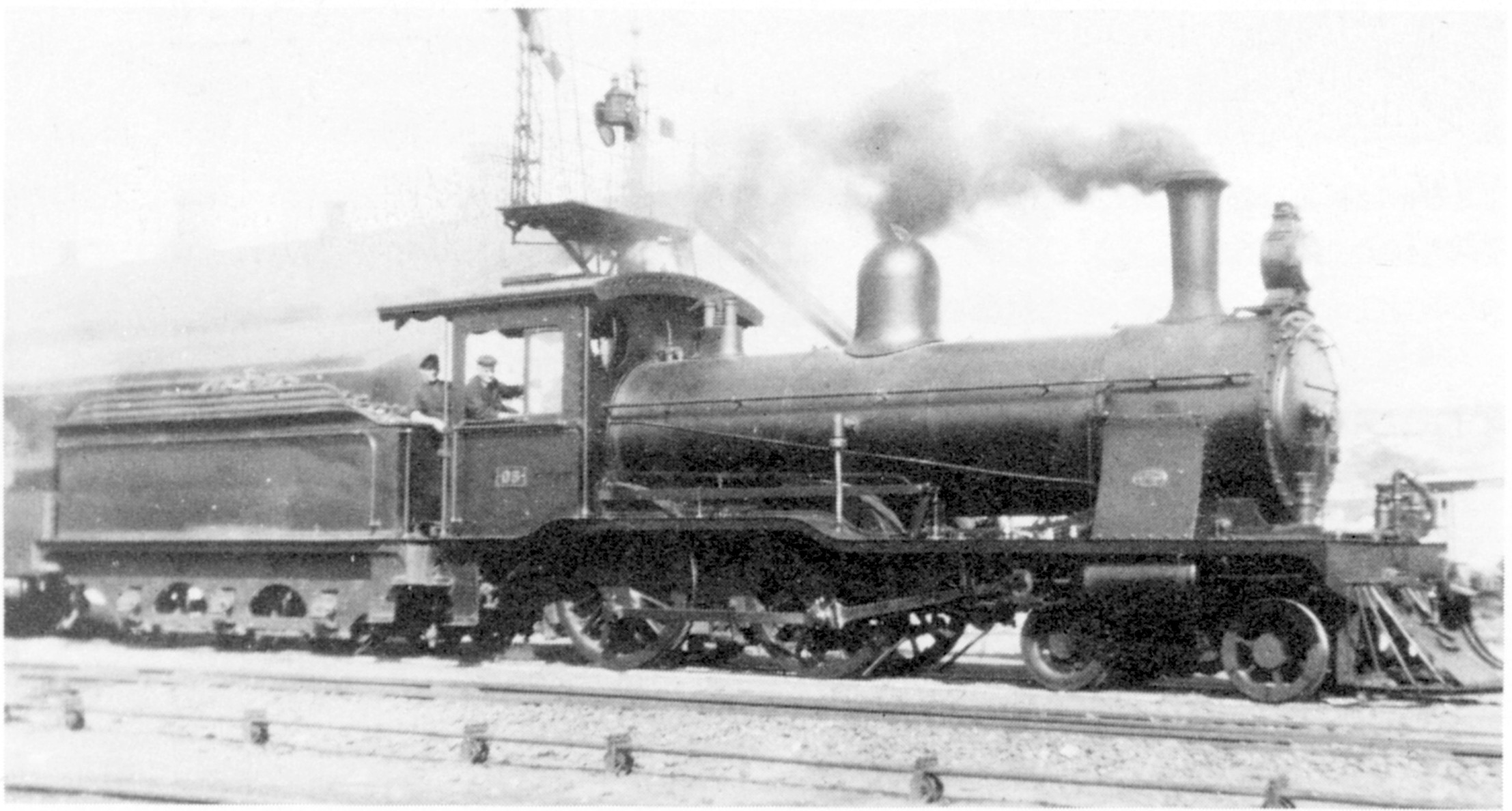
Wynberg tender no. 09, c. 1920

When the Union of South Africa was established on 31 May 1910, the three Colonial government railways (CGR, Natal Government Railways and Central South African Railways) were united under a single administration to control and administer the railways, ports and harbours of the Union. Although the South African Railways and Harbours came into existence in 1910, the actual classification and renumbering of all the rolling stock of the three constituent railways were only implemented with effect from 1 January 1912.

In 1912, the six locomotives were considered obsolete by the SAR, designated Class 03 and renumbered by having the numeral "0" prefixed to their existing numbers. In SAR service, they continued to work Cape Town's suburban trains. Despite being considered obsolete, all six engines survived until c. 1918, when two were withdrawn from service. The other four survived in service until after 1931.

== Works numbers ==
The works numbers, original numbers and renumbering of the Cape 3rd Class of 1901 are listed in the table.

CGR 3rd Class 4-4-0 of 1901
| Works no. | Orig. no. | SAR no. |
|---|---|---|
| 4710 | 6 | 06 |
| 4711 | 7 | 07 |
| 4712 | 8 | 08 |
| 4713 | 9 | 09 |
| 4714 | 10 | 010 |
| 4715 | 11 | 011 |
