= CGR 3rd Class 4-4-0 1883 =

South African steam locomotive

CGR 3rd Class 4-4-0 1883 OVGS 3rd Class 4-4-0 South African Class 03 4-4-0 1883
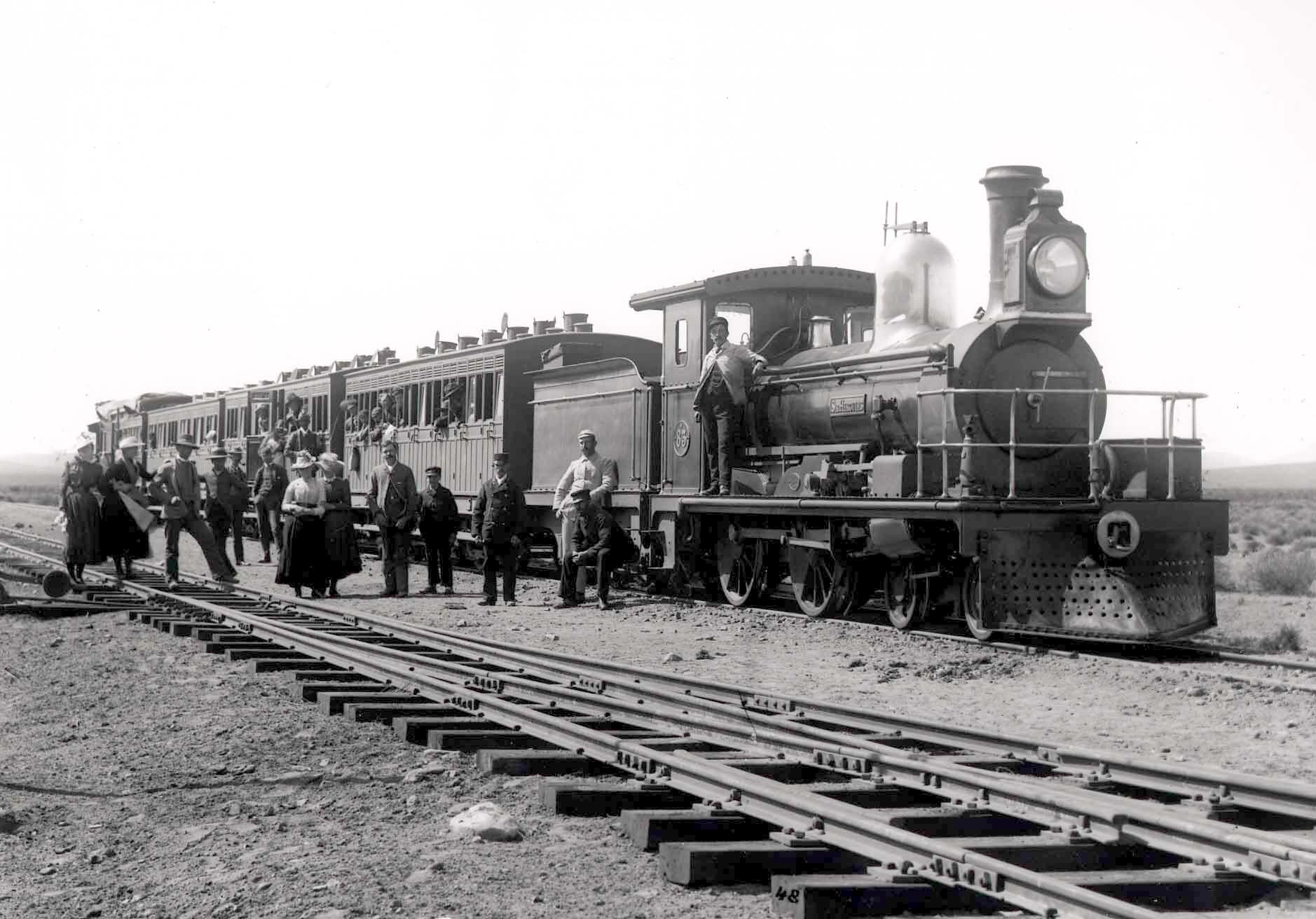
- CGR 3rd Class no. 83 Sir Hercules
Type and origin
- Power type: Steam
- Designer: Neilson and Company
- Builder: Neilson and Company
- Serial number: 2917-2934
- Build date: 1882
- Total produced: 18
Specifications
- Configuration
  - Whyte: 4-4-0 (American)
  - UIC: 2'Bn2
- Driver: 1st coupled axle
- Gauge: 3 ft 6 in (1,067 mm) Cape gauge
- Leading dia.: 27 in (686 mm)
- Coupled dia.: 48 in (1,219 mm)
- Tender wheels: 36 1/2 in (927 mm)
- Wheelbase: 34 ft 11 1/2 in (10,655 mm)
  - Engine: 17 ft 9 in (5,410 mm)
  - Leading: 5 ft (1,524 mm)
  - Coupled: 6 ft 6 in (1,981 mm)
  - Tender: 8 ft (2,438 mm)
- Length
  - Over couplers: 43 ft 3 in (13,183 mm)
- Height: 12 ft (3,658 mm)
- Axle load: 9 LT 3 cwt 2 qtr (9,322 kg)
  - Leading: 9 LT 9 cwt 2 qtr (9,627 kg)
  - Coupled: 9 LT 3 cwt 2 qtr (9,322 kg)
- Adhesive weight: 18 LT 7 cwt (18,640 kg)
- Loco weight: 29 LT 16 cwt 2 qtr (30,300 kg)
- Tender weight: 19 LT 12 cwt 3 qtr (19,950 kg)
- Total weight: 49 LT 9 cwt 1 qtr (50,260 kg)
- Tender type: 3-axle
- Fuel type: Coal
- Fuel capacity: 2 LT 15 cwt (2.8 t)
- Water cap.: 1,700 imp gal (7,700 L)
- Firebox
  - Type: Round-top
  - Grate area: 11.25 sq ft (1.045 m^{2})
- Boiler
  - Pitch: 6 ft (1,829 mm)
  - Tube plates: 10 ft 4 1/2 in (3,162 mm)
  - Small tubes: 145: 1 3/4 in (44 mm)
- Boiler pressure: 130 psi (896 kPa)
- Safety valve: Salter
- Heating surface
  - Firebox: 62.5 sq ft (5.81 m^{2})
  - Tubes: 690 sq ft (64 m^{2})
  - Total surface: 752.5 sq ft (69.91 m^{2})
- Cylinders: Two
- Cylinder size: 15 in (381 mm) bore 20 in (508 mm) stroke
- Valve gear: Joy
- Valve type: Slide
- Couplers: Johnston link-and-pin
Performance figures
- Tractive effort: 9,140 lbf (40.7 kN) @ 75%
Career
- Operators: Cape Government Railways; OVGS; South African Railways
- Class: CGR 3rd Class, SAR Class 03
- Number in class: 18
- Numbers: W77-88, E15-E16, M80-M83
- Nicknames: Four-coupled Joy
- Delivered: 1883
- First run: 1883

The Cape Government Railways 3rd Class 4-4-0 of 1883 was a South African steam locomotive from the pre-Union era in the Cape of Good Hope.

In 1882, the Cape Government Railways placed orders with Neilson and Company for eighteen 3rd Class tender locomotives with a 4-4-0 American type wheel arrangement. They were intended for fast passenger service on all three Cape Systems and were delivered early in 1883.

== Manufacturer ==
Eighteen 4-4-0 American type tender passenger locomotives were delivered to the Cape Government Railways (CGR) from Neilson and Company in 1883. They were numbered in the ranges from W77 to W88 for the Western System, E15 and E16 for the Eastern System and M80 to M83 for the Midland system. They had been ordered in 1882 for passenger service out of Cape Town, East London and Port Elizabeth respectively and were equipped with six-wheeled tenders.

== Characteristics ==
The locomotive's slide valves were arranged above the inclined cylinders and were actuated by Joy valve gear, which had been invented in 1879 by David Joy, the Locomotive Superintendent of the Oxford, Dorchester and Wolverhampton Railway. Joy valve gear did not make use of eccentrics like the Stephenson Link valve gear which had hitherto been used and which, at times, proved to be troublesome.

The Roscoe-type lubricator to lubricate the cylinders was affixed on top of the smokebox to the rear of the chimney, since this position was convenient for obtaining a good connection with the main steam pipes.

The locomotives were equipped with Adams' Vortex blast pipes. These had an outer annular orifice for steam and an inner circular opening for exhaust gases and formed the upper portion of a bell-mouth scoop. The lower portion of the scoop was open towards the bottom rows of tubes so that the draught though them was increased. The vortex blast pipes were, however, removed after a few years since it was found to choke up more readily than an ordinary blast pipe.

== Service ==
The locomotives became known as the Four-coupled Joys, from the Joy valve gear that they were equipped with. One of the locomotives is known to have been named Sir Hercules, after Hercules Robinson, 1st Baron Rosmead, who had succeeded Sir Henry Bartle Frere as High Commissioner for Southern Africa in 1880 and after whom two towns in South Africa were named. The named engine was no. 83, which was either the Midland System's no. M83 or the Western System's no. W83. All these locomotives were later designated 3rd Class when a locomotive classification system was introduced by the CGR.

=== Cape Government Railways ===
As was usual practice with passenger locomotives on the CGR, the engines were painted green and had polished brass domes. In service, the Joy valve gear proved unsatisfactory and three of the Western System's locomotives were later converted to Stephenson valve gear at the CGR's Salt River shops in Cape Town. Even though this improved their performance, the modification was not carried out on any of the other locomotives.

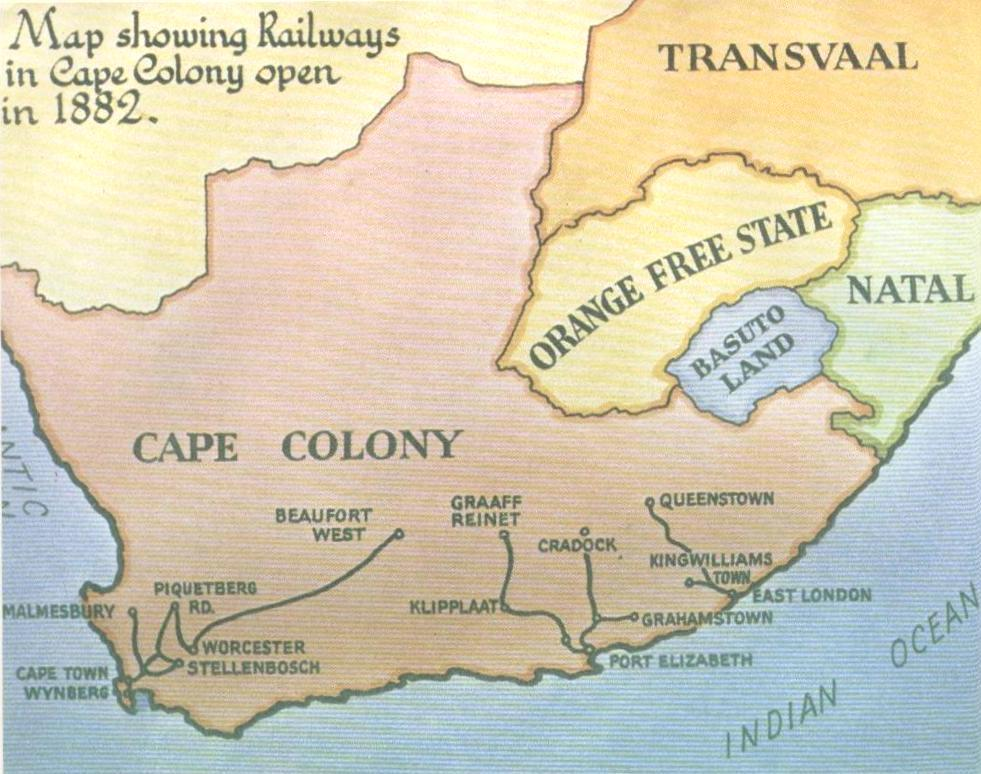

At the time the Four-coupled Joy locomotives entered service in 1883, the Eastern System mainline from East London was open as far as Queenstown with a branch to King William's Town, the two Midland System mainlines from Port Elizabeth were respectively open to Graaff Reinet and approaching Rosmead via Cradock with a branch to Grahamstown, while the Western System mainline from Cape Town was approaching De Aar with a branch to Malmesbury.

All these locomotives were renumbered at times during the CGR era. By 1886, the system prefixes had been done away with. The locomotives on the Western System retained their numbers, while the Midland System's locomotives were renumbered to the range from 180 to 183. The Eastern System's two locomotives were renumbered from E15 and E16 to 610 and 611 respectively. By 1888, after the three systems had been linked up at De Aar on 31 March 1884, the Midland System's locomotives were renumbered once again, to the range from 89 to 92, following on from the numbers of the Western System's locomotives.

=== Oranje-Vrijstaat Gouwerment-Spoorwegen ===
In late 1896, some of these locomotives were sold to the Oranje-Vrijstaat Gouwerment-Spoorwegen, where they retained their classification as 3rd Class. The sale most probably involved the five locomotives whose numbers were absent from the CGR roster for the first time by year-end 1896, as listed in the table. These engines were later fitted with the Tilney-design extended type of smokebox with spark arresters.

=== South African Railways ===
When the Union of South Africa was established on 31 May 1910, the three Colonial government railways (CGR, Natal Government Railways and Central South African Railways) were united under a single administration to control and administer the railways, ports and harbours of the Union. Although the South African Railways and Harbours came into existence in 1910, the actual classification and renumbering of all the rolling stock of the three constituent railways was only implemented with effect from 1 January 1912.

By 1912, only one of these locomotives survived, the Eastern System's no. 611. It was considered obsolete by the SAR, designated Class 03 and renumbered to 0611. By 1918, it had been scrapped.

== Works numbers ==
The works numbers, original numbers and renumbering of the Cape 3rd Class of 1883 are listed in the table.

CGR 3rd Class 4-4-0 of 1883
Works no.	Orig. no.	1886 no.	1888 no.	1890 no.	1896 no.	SAR no. & notes
2917	W77	77	77	77	77	
2918	W78	78	78	78	OVGS?	
2919	E15	610	610	610	610	
2920	E16	611	611	611	611	0611
2921	W79	79	79	79	OVGS?	
2922	W80	80	80	80	80	
2923	M80	180	89	89	89	
2924	M81	181	90	90	90	
2925	W81	81	81	81	OVGS?	
2926	W82	82	82	82	82	
2927	M82	182	91			
2928	M83	183	92	92	92	Sir Hercules?
2929	W83	83	83	83	83	Sir Hercules?
2930	W84	84	84	84	84	
2931	W85	85	85	85	OVGS?	
2932	W86	86	86	86	86	
2933	W87	87	87	87	OVGS?	
2934	W88	88	88	88	88	

== Illustration ==
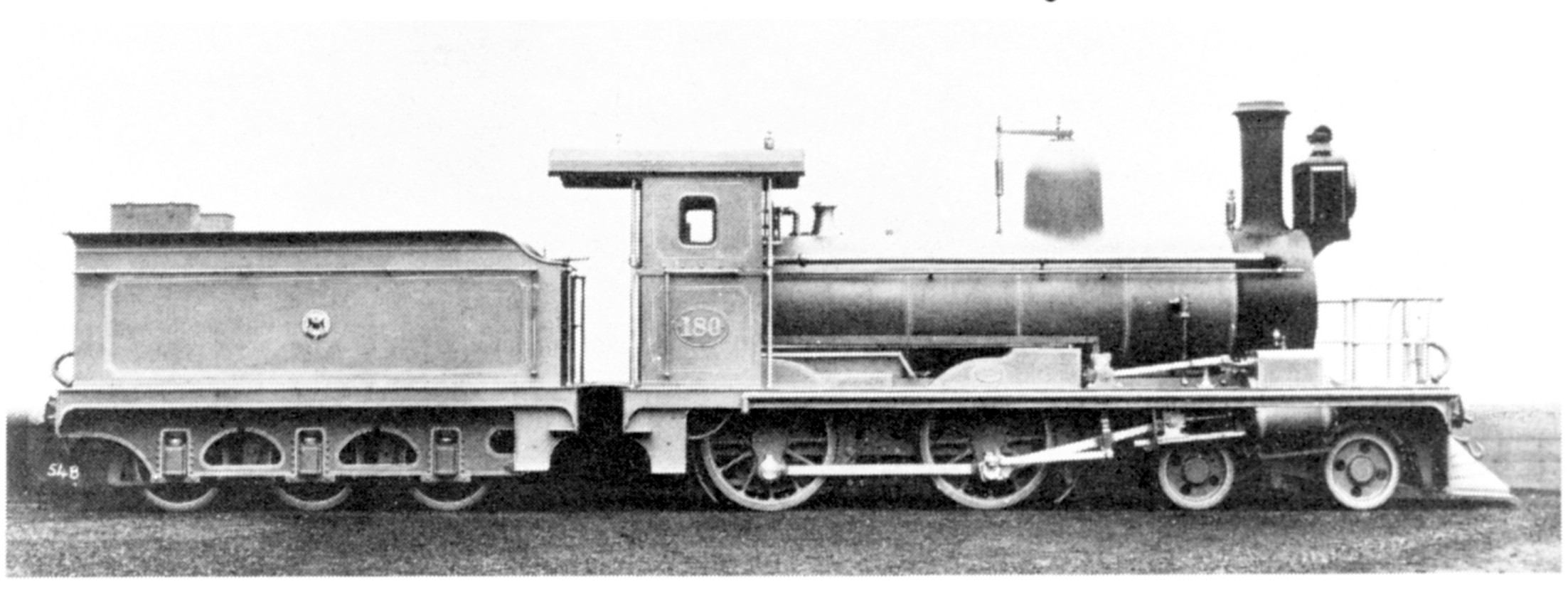
Midland System no. 180, ex no. M80, later no. 89, c. 1886

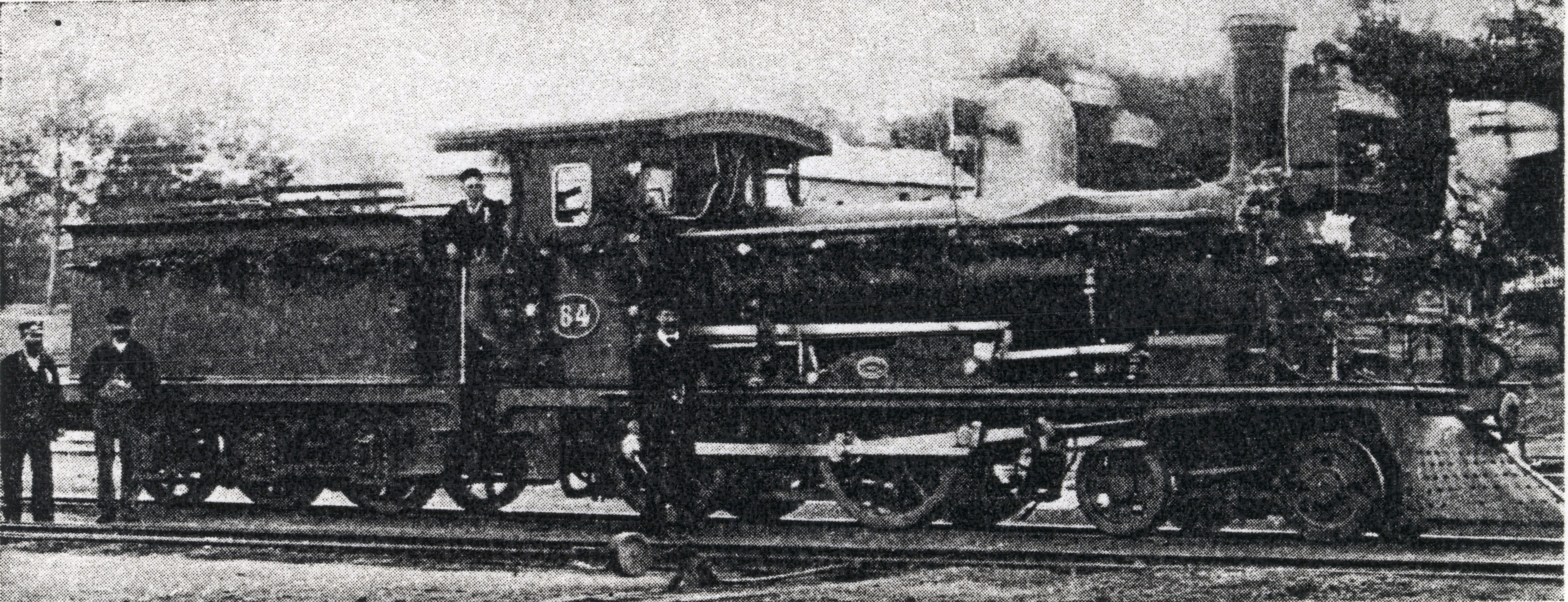
Western System no. 84, decorated in honour of Queen Victoria's jubilee, c. 1887

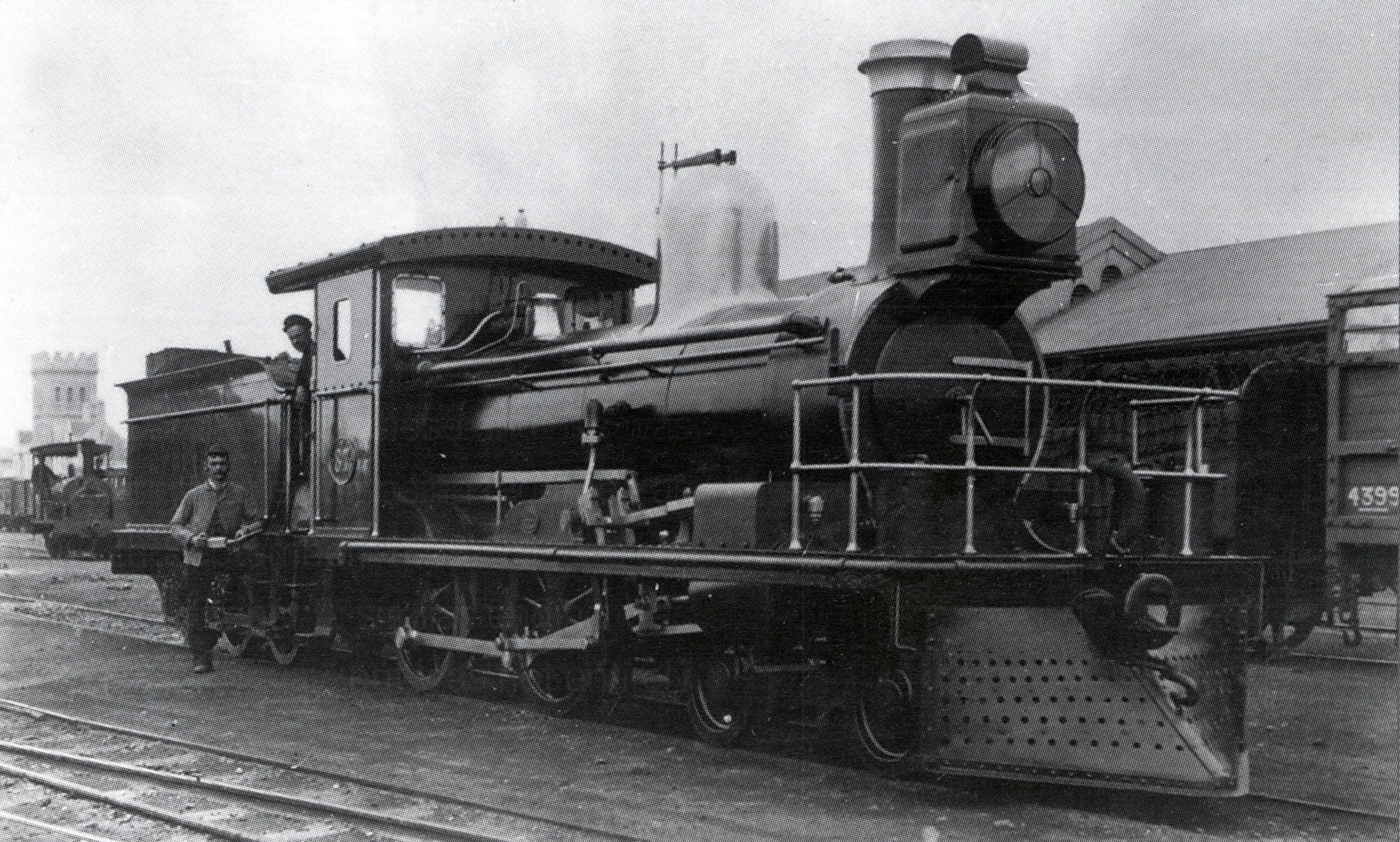
Western System no. W87, c. 1883
