= CGR 3rd Class 4-4-0 1889 =

Type of locomotive

CGR 3rd Class 4-4-0 1889 South African Class 03 4-4-0 1889
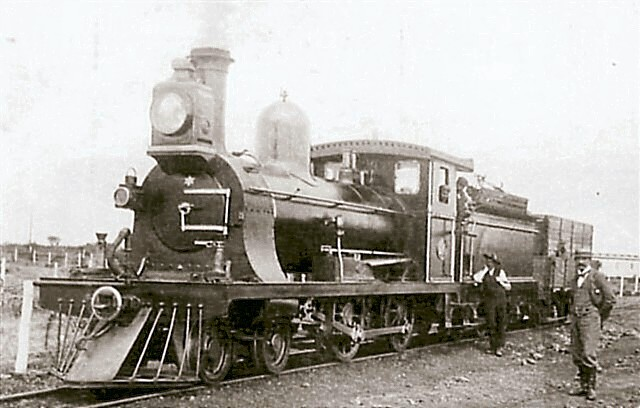
- CGR 3rd Class 4-4-0 no. 114 of 1889
Type and origin
- Power type: Steam
- Designer: Cape Government Railways (Michael Stephens)
- Builder: Dübs and Company
- Serial number: 2486-2497, 2536-2547
- Build date: 1888-1889
- Total produced: 24
Specifications
- Configuration
  - Whyte: 4-4-0 (American)
  - UIC: 2'Bn2
- Driver: 1st coupled axle
- Gauge: 3 ft 6 in (1,067 mm) Cape gauge
- Leading dia.: 28 in (711 mm)
- Coupled dia.: 49 in (1,245 mm)
- Tender wheels: 37 in (940 mm)
- Wheelbase: 37 ft 9 1/2 in (11,519 mm)
  - Engine: 18 ft 4 1/2 in (5,601 mm)
  - Leading: 4 ft 8 in (1,422 mm)
  - Coupled: 7 ft (2,134 mm)
  - Tender: 10 ft (3,048 mm)
- Length
  - Over couplers: 45 ft 8 1/2 in (13,932 mm)
- Height: 12 ft (3,658 mm)
- Axle load: 10 LT 12 cwt (10,770 kg)
  - Leading: 9 LT 13 cwt (9,805 kg)
  - Coupled: 10 LT 12 cwt (10,770 kg)
  - Tender axle: 9 LT (9,144 kg)
- Adhesive weight: 21 LT 4 cwt (21,540 kg)
- Loco weight: 30 LT 17 cwt (31,350 kg)
- Tender weight: 27 LT (27,430 kg)
- Total weight: 57 LT 17 cwt (58,780 kg)
- Tender type: 3-axle
- Fuel type: Coal
- Fuel capacity: 3 LT (3.0 t)
- Water cap.: 1,950 imp gal (8,860 L)
- Firebox
  - Type: Round-top
  - Grate area: 13 sq ft (1.2 m^{2})
- Boiler
  - Pitch: 6 ft 1 in (1,854 mm)
  - Diameter: 3 ft 8 1/2 in (1,130 mm)
  - Tube plates: 10 ft 4 1/2 in (3,162 mm)
- Boiler pressure: 150 psi (1,034 kPa)
- Safety valve: Ramsbottom
- Heating surface
  - Firebox: 74.5 sq ft (6.92 m^{2})
  - Tubes: 689 sq ft (64.0 m^{2})
  - Total surface: 763.5 sq ft (70.93 m^{2})
- Cylinders: Two
- Cylinder size: 15 in (381 mm) bore 22 in (559 mm) stroke
- Valve gear: Stephenson
- Couplers: Johnston link-and-pin
Performance figures
- Tractive effort: 11,365 lbf (50.55 kN) @ 75%
Career
- Operators: Cape Government Railways; South African Railways
- Class: CGR 3rd Class, SAR Class 03
- Number in class: 24
- Numbers: 93-116
- Delivered: 1889
- First run: 1889

The Cape Government Railways 3rd Class 4-4-0 of 1889 was a South African steam locomotive from the pre-Union era in the Cape of Good Hope.

In 1889, the Cape Government Railways placed 24 3rd Class tender locomotives with a 4-4-0 American type wheel arrangement in service. They were intended for passenger service on the Cape Western System.

== Beyond Kimberley ==
In addition to increasing traffic on the Western System during 1887, the planned extension of the mainline northwards from Kimberley to Vryburg would also require an increase in the locomotive fleet. Michael Stephens, who had succeeded Hawthorne Thornton in 1885 as the Locomotive Superintendent of the Western System of the Cape Government Railways (CGR), therefore drew up detailed designs for a new 3rd Class passenger locomotive for the Western System. The drawings were prepared in the Salt River drawing office in Cape Town.

== Manufacturer ==
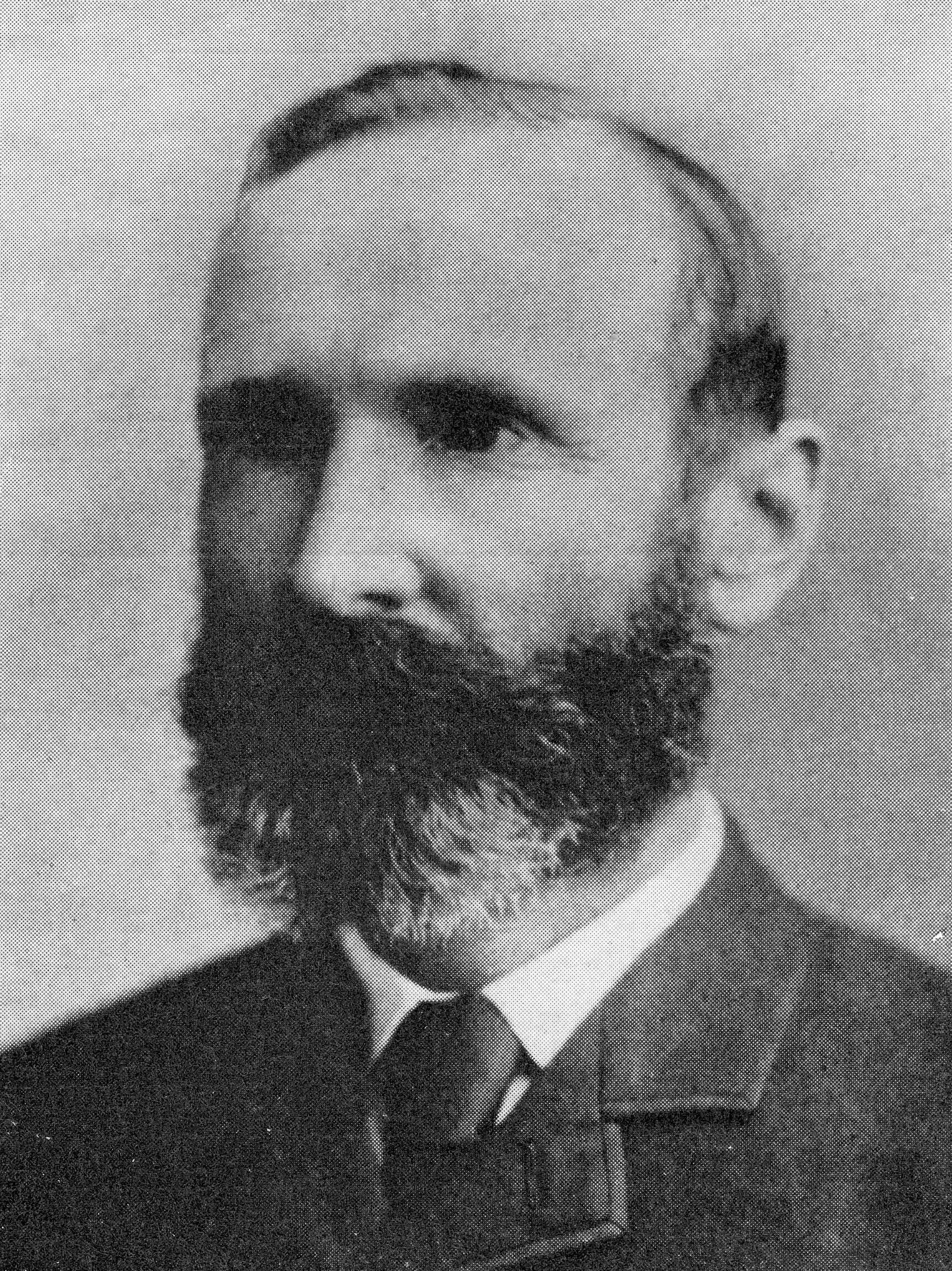
Michael Stephens

An order for 24 of these locomotives was placed with Dübs and Company in Glasgow. The locomotives were built in two batches of twelve and were delivered early in 1889, numbered in the range from 93 to 116.

With a boiler pressure of 150 pounds per square inch (1,034 kilopascals), these were the first South African engines to use Ramsbottom safety valves instead of the older Salter spring balance valves. The overall design resulted in an attractive locomotive which reflected credit on the designer and the drawing office.

== Service ==
=== Cape Government Railways ===
The locomotives were, at the time, modern and up to date with latest practices and were possibly the most efficient engines in the country. As was usual practice with passenger locomotives on the CGR, they were painted green and had polished brass domes. They were placed in service on the easier sections of the Western System and were used on all types of traffic. On the section between Beaufort West and Kimberley, they worked passenger trains successfully in spite of the poor quality coal from the colliery at Viljoensdrif, thanks to their more liberally-proportioned boilers.

During the Second Boer War from 1899 to 1902, at least one of these locomotives, no. 108, had armour plating fitted to protect the engine and crew from Boer small-arms fire. Two of the photographs show no. 108 in armour plating.

By 1904, six of the locomotives were transferred to the Midland System and renumbered in the range from 405 to 410. Here they were employed on the line between Port Elizabeth and Uitenhage.

=== South African Railways ===
When the Union of South Africa was established on 31 May 1910, the three Colonial government railways (CGR, Natal Government Railways and Central South African Railways) were united under a single administration to control and administer the railways, ports and harbours of the Union. Although the South African Railways and Harbours came into existence in 1910, the actual classification and renumbering of all the rolling stock of the three constituent railways was only implemented with effect from 1 January 1912.

All 24 locomotives survived to be taken onto the SAR roster in 1912. Since they were considered obsolete by then, they were designated Class 03 and renumbered by having the numeral "0" prefixed to their existing numbers. In SAR service, they continued to work on the Uitenhage line on the Midland System and on shunting and light duties on the Western System. Some of them survived until 1923.

== Works numbers ==
The works numbers, original numbers and renumbering of the Cape 3rd Class of 1889 are listed in the table.

CGR 3rd Class 4-4-0 of 1889
Works no.	Orig. no.	1904 no.	SAR no.
2486	93	93	093
2487	94	94	094
2488	95	95	095
2489	96	409	0409
2490	97	97	097
2491	98	406	0406
2492	99	99	099
2493	100	100	0100
2494	101	407	0407
2495	102	102	0102
2496	103	103	0103
2497	104	408	0408
2536	105	105	0105
2537	106	106	0106
2538	107	107	0107
2539	108	108	0108
2540	109	109	0109
2541	110	410	0410
2542	111	405	0405
2543	112	112	0112
2544	113	113	0113
2545	114	114	0114
2546	115	115	0115
2547	116	116	0116

== Illustration ==
The main picture shows no. 114 near Bulawayo in Southern Rhodesia, c. 1900, working on the line from the Cape of Good Hope through the Bechuanaland Protectorate.

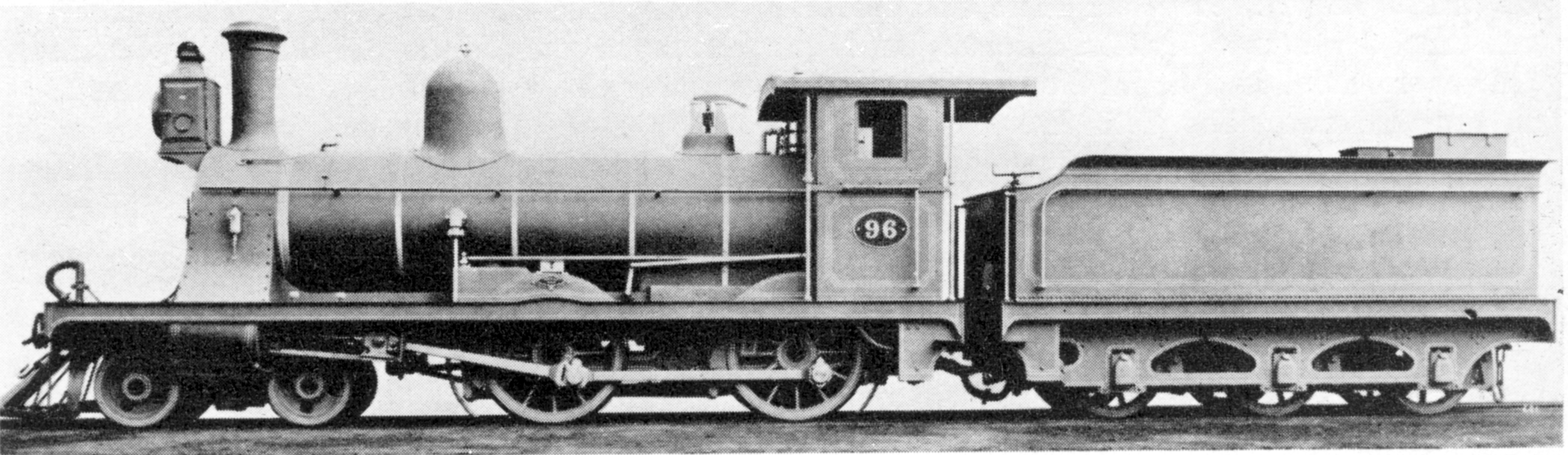
Works picture of no. 96, c. 1889
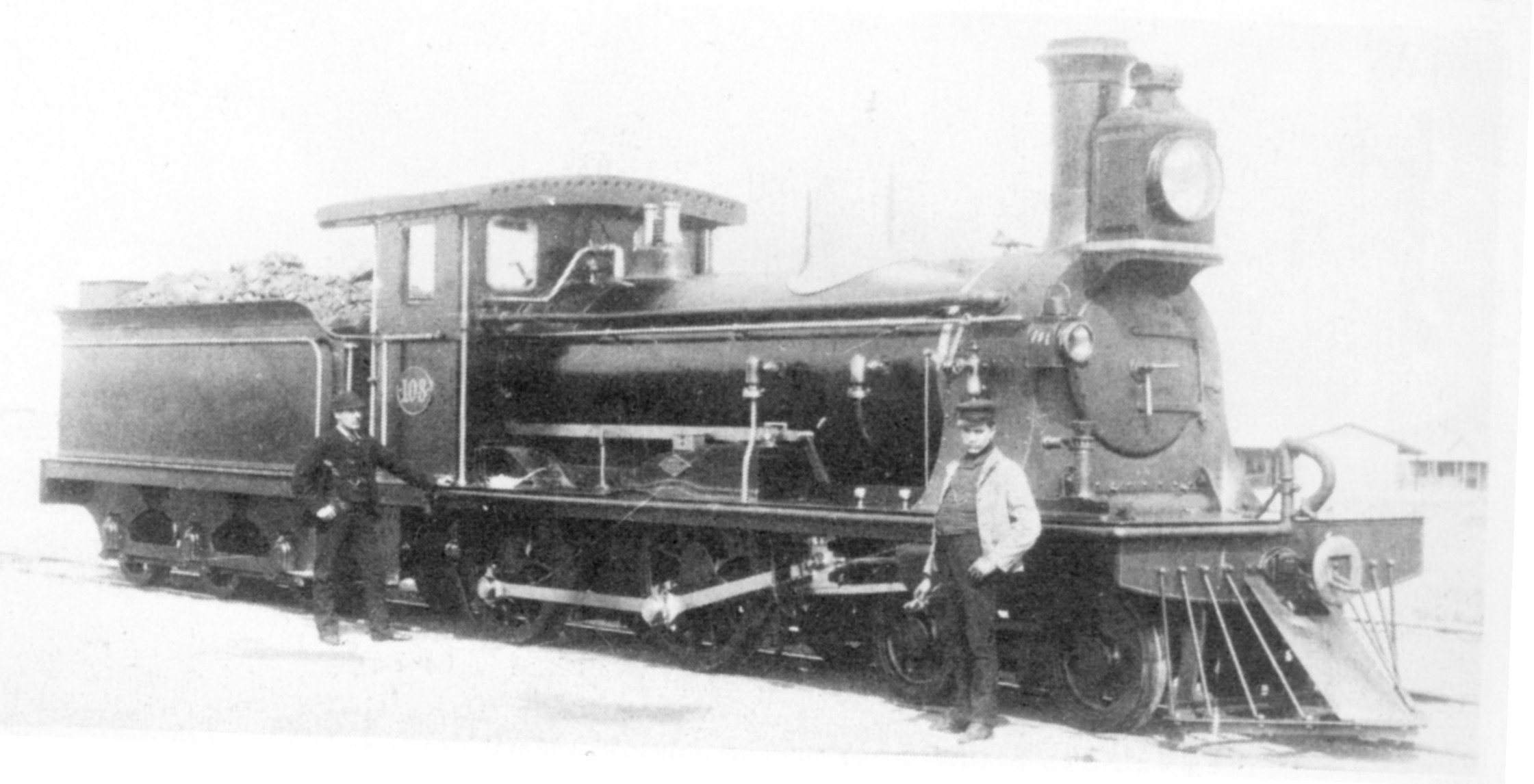
No. 108 in service, c. 1890

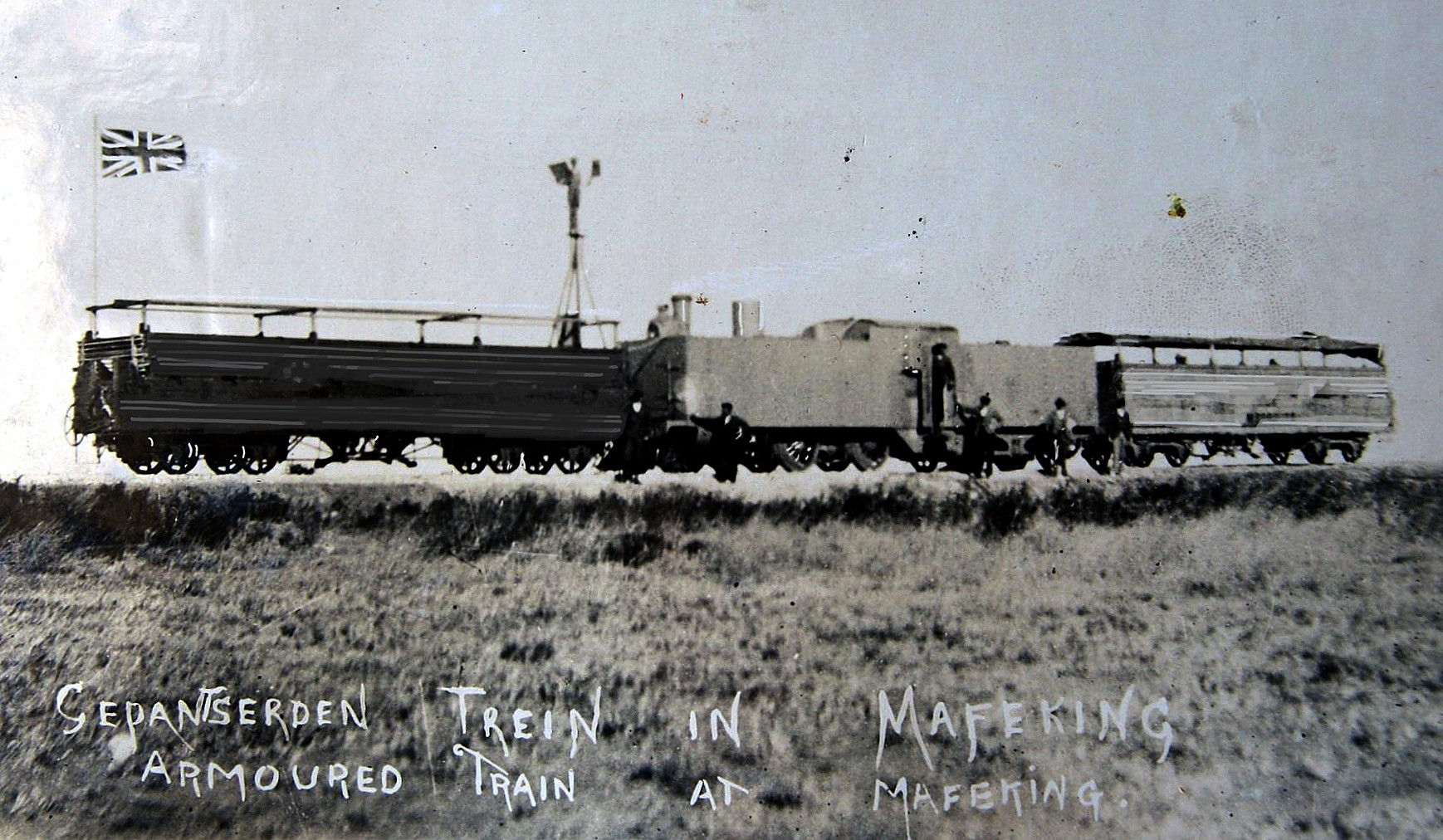
Armoured 3rd Class 4-4-0 locomotive at Mafeking, c. 1899

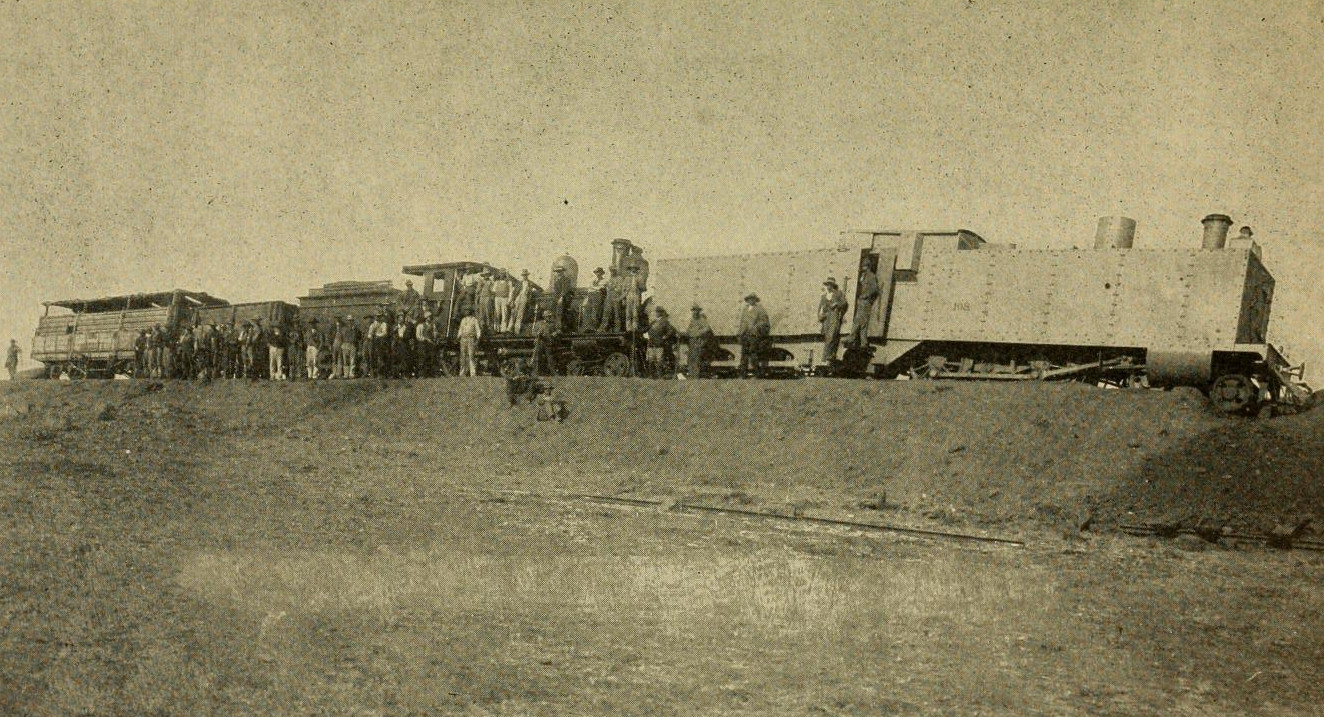
Armoured no. 108 derailed at Kraaipan, 12 October 1899
