= 1903 in South Africa =

- Decades: 1880s; 1890s; 1900s; 1910s; 1920s
- See also: List of years in South Africa

The following lists events that happened during 1903 in South Africa.

== Incumbents ==
=== Cape Colony ===
- Governor of the Cape of Good Hope:Walter Hely-Hutchinson.
- Prime Minister of the Cape of Good Hope: John Gordon Sprigg.

=== Natal ===
- Governor of the Colony of Natal: Henry Edward McCallum.
- Prime Minister of the Colony of Natal: Albert Henry Hime (until 17 August), George Morris Sutton (starting 17 August).

=== Orange River Colony ===
- Governor of the Orange River Colony and High Commissioner for Southern Africa: Alfred Milner, 1st Viscount Milner.
- Lieutenant-Governor of the Orange River Colony: Hamilton Goold-Adams.

=== Transvaal ===
- Governor of the Transvaal and High Commissioner for Southern Africa: Alfred Milner, 1st Viscount Milner.
- Lieutenant-Governor of the Transvaal: Arthur Lawley.

== Events ==
February

- Mahatma Gandhi enrolls to the Bar of the Transvaal Supreme Court.

March

- 12 – Andries Dreyer, an archivist of the Dutch Reformed Church, is ordained as a missionary of the congregation for the Hanover Street area in Cape Town.

May

- 21 – The first contingent of Chinese labourers leave China to work on the Witwatersrand gold mines.

June

- 4 – The Indian Opinion is started by Mahatma Gandhi with Mansukhlal Nazar as editor.

Unknown date

- The County of Pembroke, a British cargo ship, is shipwrecked near Port Elizabeth.

== Births ==
- 11 January – Alan Paton, author and founder of the Liberal Party of South Africa, is born in Pietermaritzburg, Natal.
- 21 March – J. B. Marks, political activist and trade unionist, is born in Ventersdorp. (d. 1972)
- 4 May – Louise Behrens, novelist and Afrikaans journalist, is born in the Orange River Colony.
- 4 May – Hendrik Susan, orchestra leader and violist.
- 19 June – Wally Hammond, English first-class cricketer and South African sports administrator. (d. 1965)
- 8 October – Mikro (Pseudonym for C.H. Kühn), writer and poet, is born at Van Reenens Farm in the Williston district.

== Deaths ==
- 21 February – Kate Vaughan, British dancer and actress (born 1852)
- 13 March – General David Johannes Joubert (Ou Kat), a South African explorer to East Africa, dies of malaria near Dar es Salaam, Tanzania.
- 8 August – Adolf Schiel, German-born officer in Boer armed forces. (b. 1858)

== Railways ==
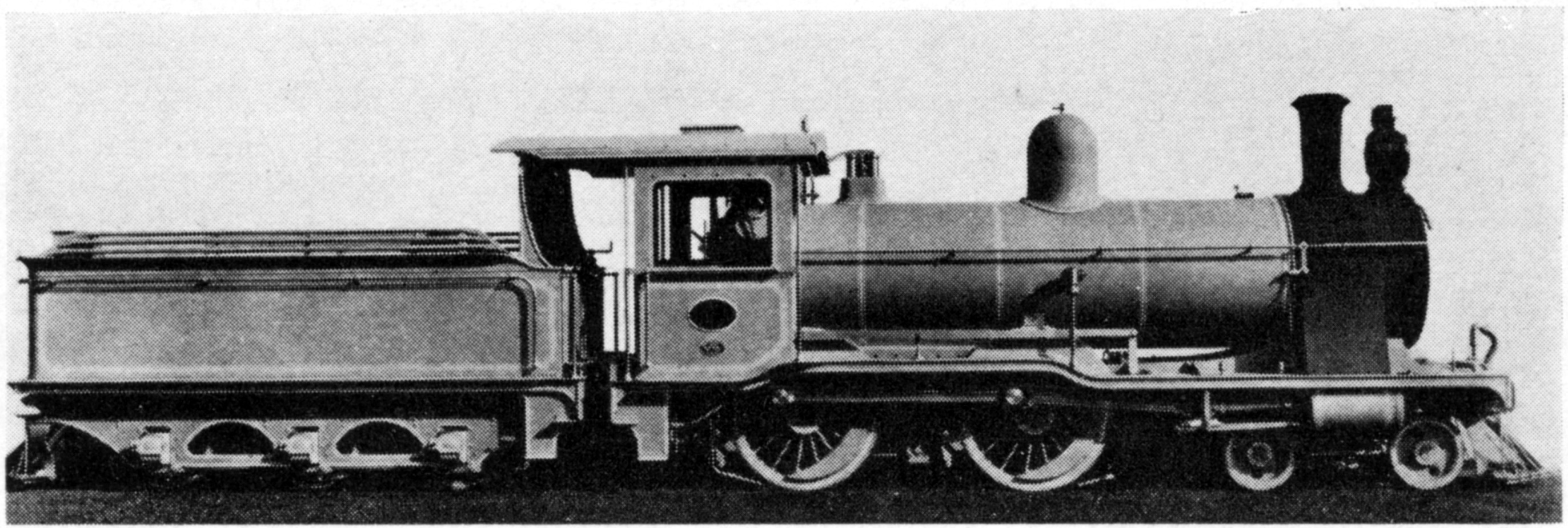
CGR Wynberg Tender

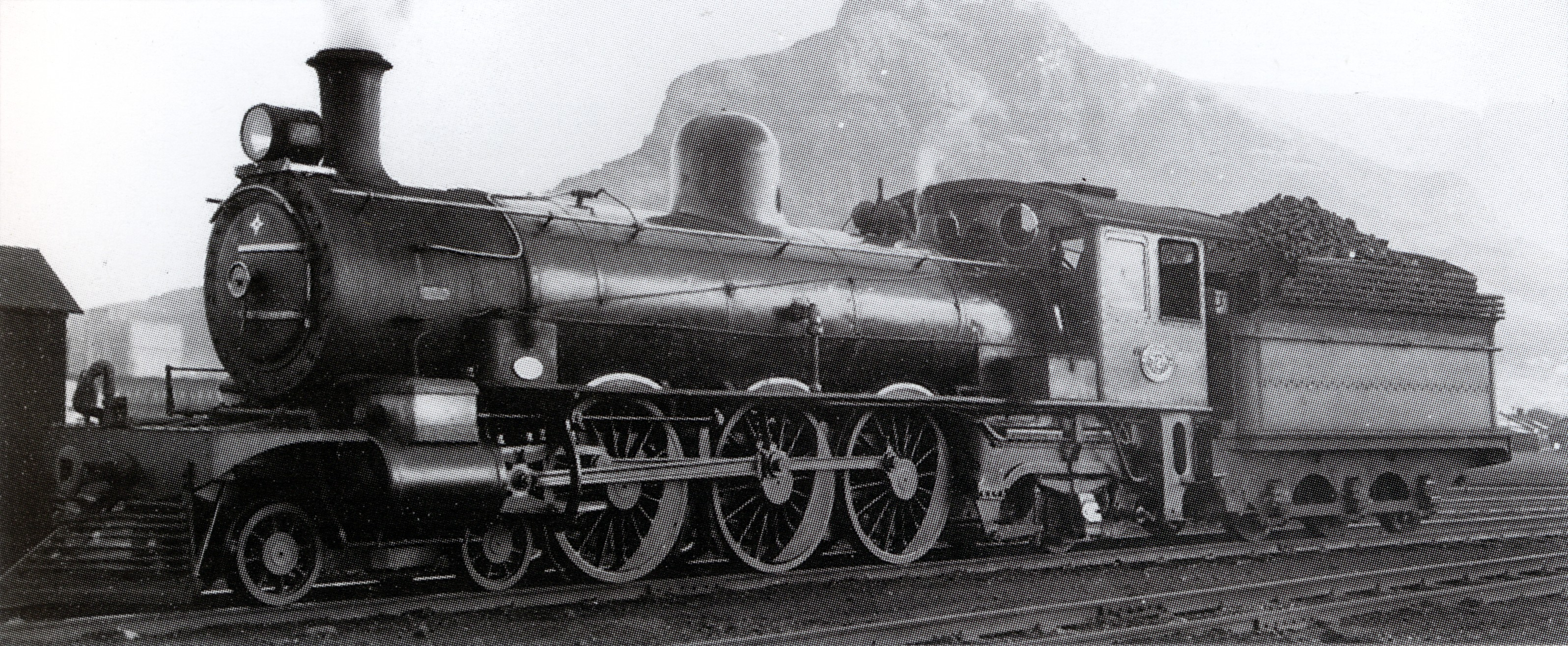
CGR Karoo Class

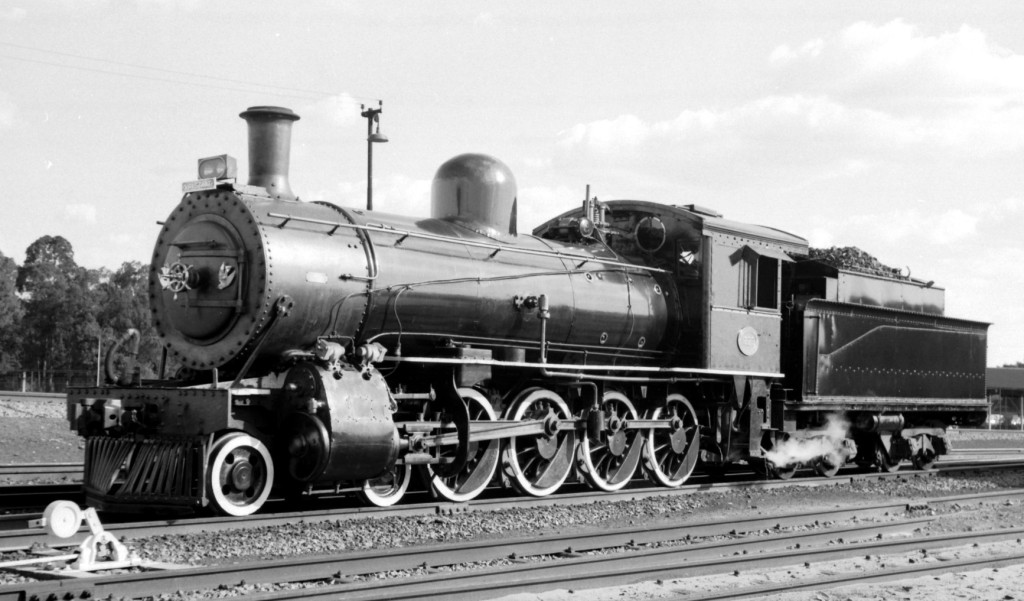
SAR Class 8D

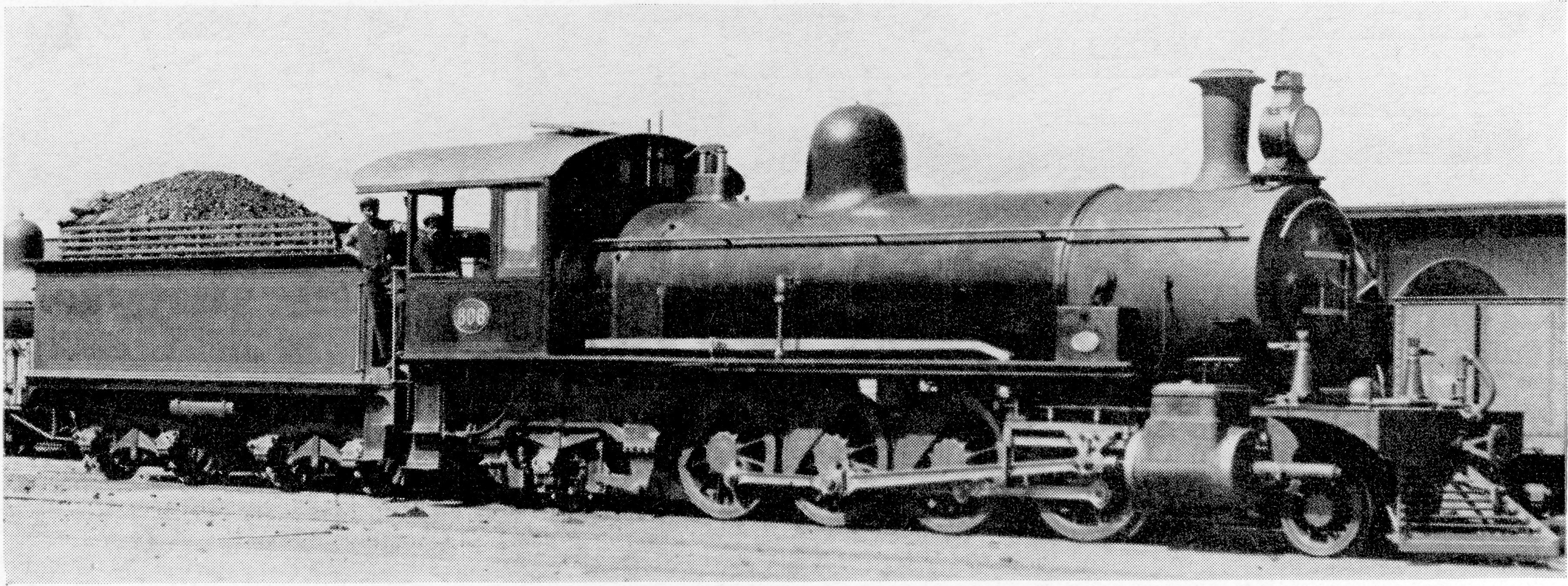
CGR 9th Class

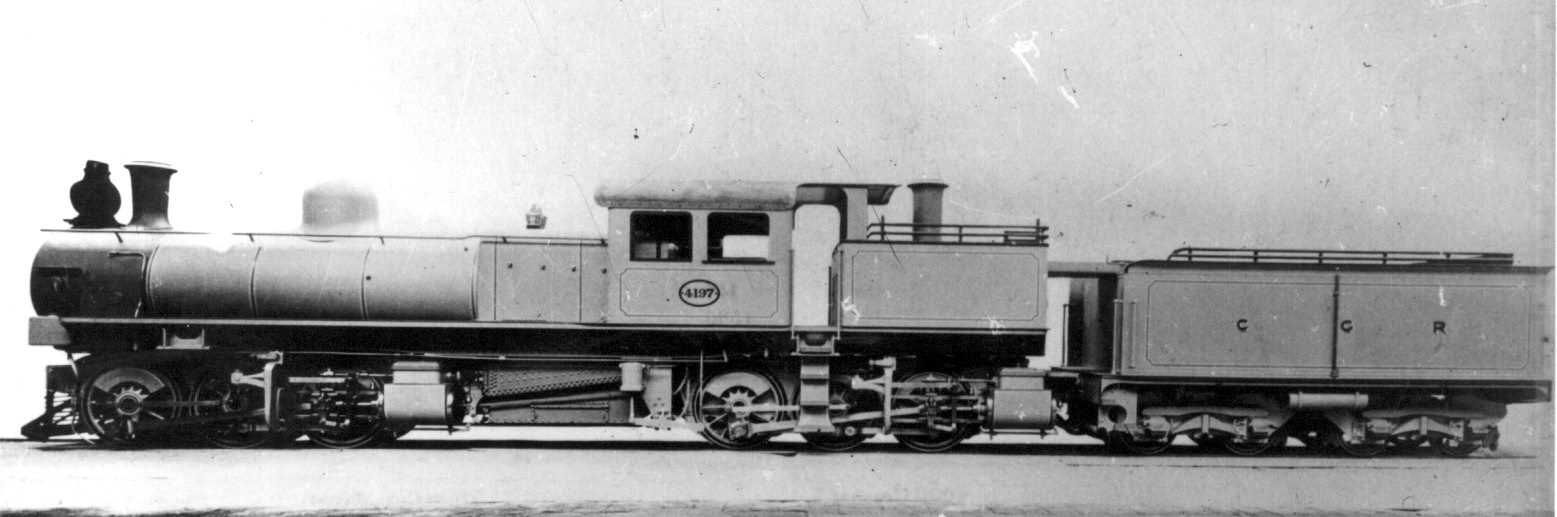
CGR Kitson-Meyer

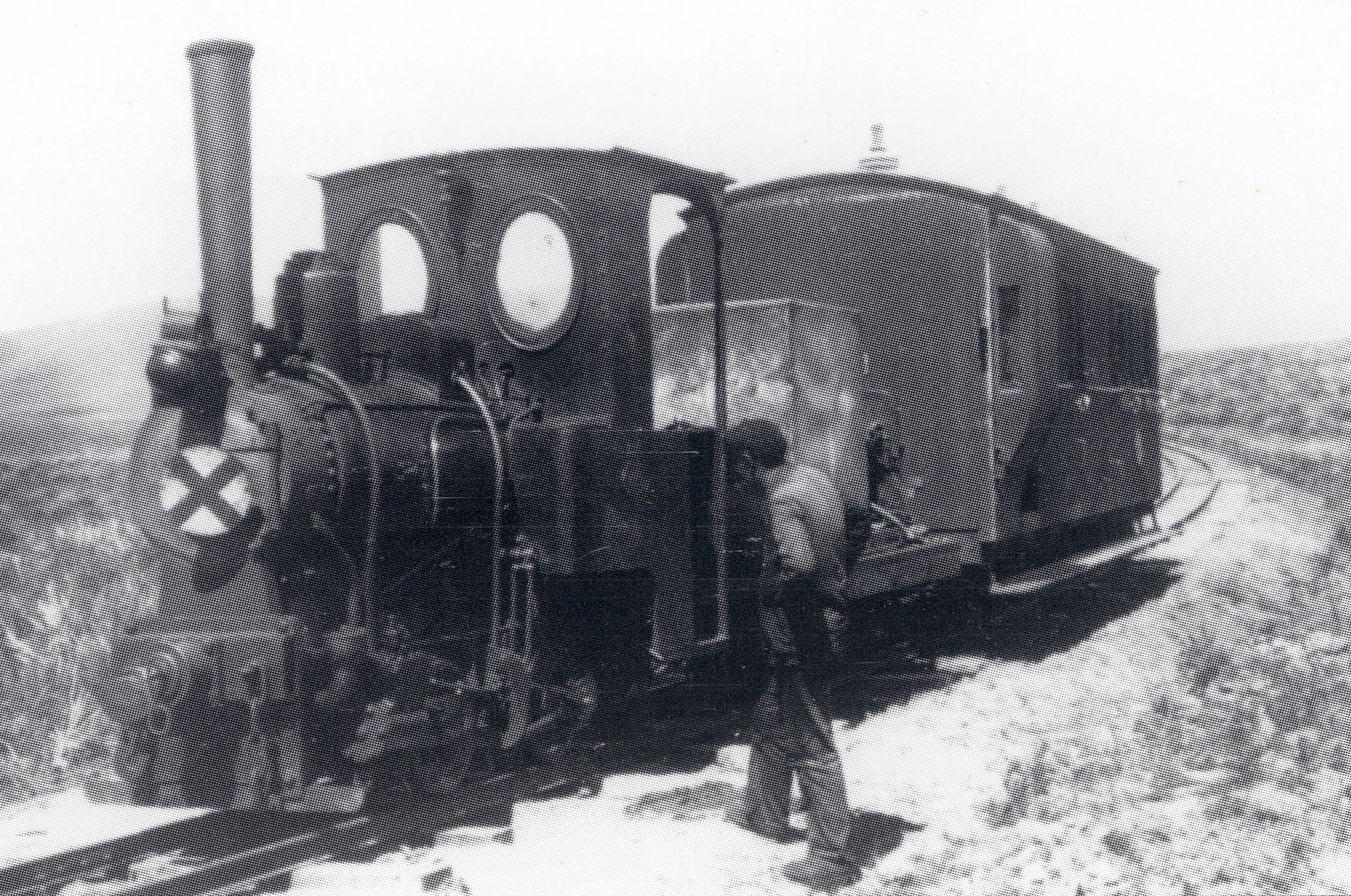
CGR NG 0-4-0T

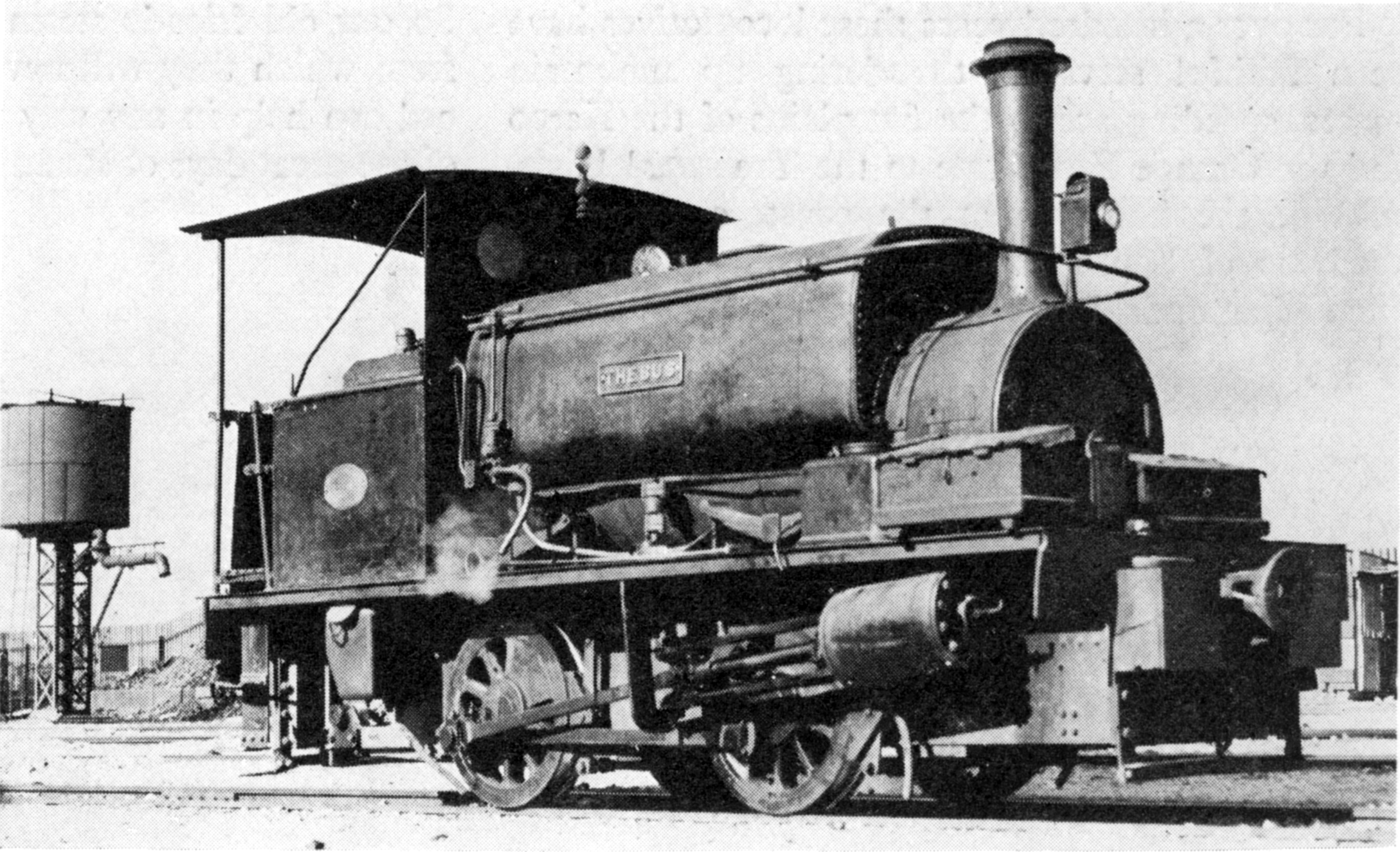
Cape PWD Thebus

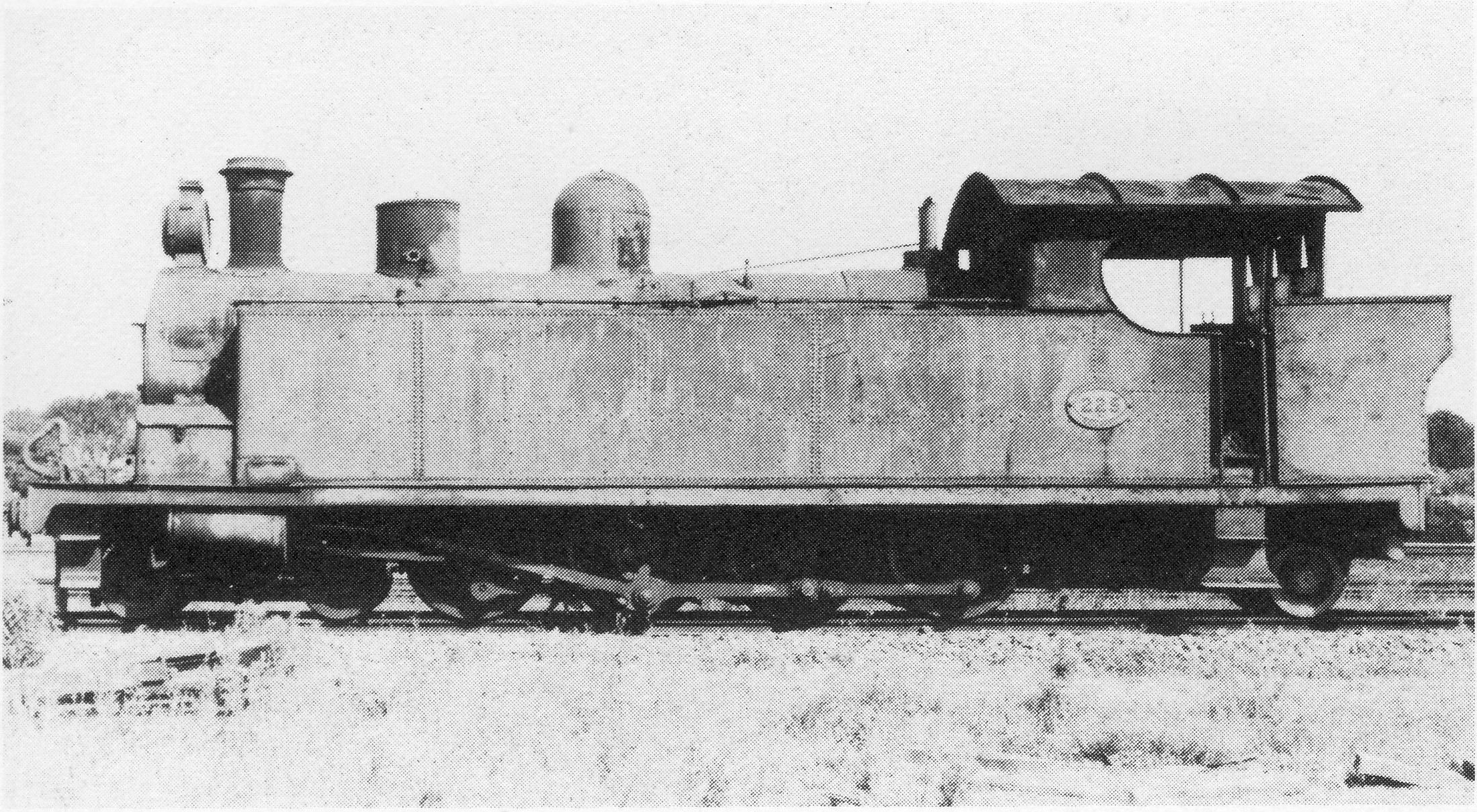
CSAR Class E 4-8-2T

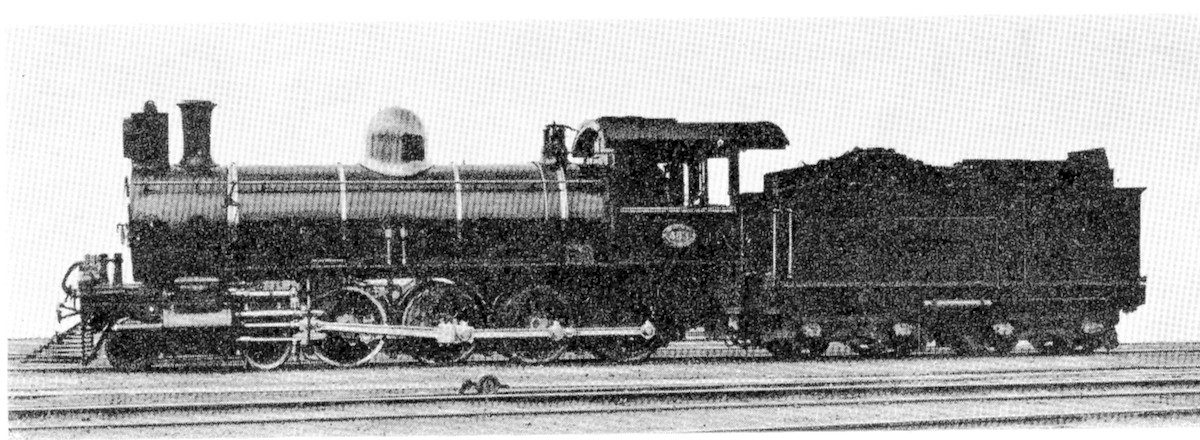
CSAR Class 8-L3

=== Railway lines opened ===
- 19 February – Cape Central – Swellendam to Riversdale, 64 miles (103.0 kilometres).
- 28 February – Cape Western – Kalbaskraal to Hopefield (Narrow gauge), 46 miles 79 chains (75.6 kilometres).
- 22 March – Free State – Sannaspos to Thaba 'Nchu, 17 miles 3 chains (27.4 kilometres).
- 1 April – Free State – Harrismith to Aberfeldy, 20 miles 60 chains (33.4 kilometres).
- 27 April – Transvaal – India Junction to Driehoek (avoiding line), 55 chains (1.1 kilometres).
- 17 September – Natal – Mhlatuze to Somkele, 55 miles 17 chains (88.9 kilometres).
- 1 November – Transvaal – India Junction to New Canada, 14 miles 31 chains (23.2 kilometres).
- 12 November – Natal – Talana to Lucas Meyer, 50 miles 64 chains (81.8 kilometres).
- 14 December – Cape Eastern – King William's Town to Middledrift, 33 miles (53.1 kilometres).
- 14 December – Cape Midland – Cookhouse to Adelaide, 42 miles 52 chains (68.6 kilometres).
- 14 December – Cape Midland – Willowmore to Le Roux, 75 miles 49 chains (121.7 kilometres).

=== Locomotives ===
Cape

- Nine new Cape gauge and two narrow gauge locomotive types enter service on the Cape Government Railways (CGR):
  - The last eight 3rd Class Wynberg Tender suburban locomotives in Cape Town.
  - Two Karoo Class 4-6-2 Pacific passenger locomotives. In 1912 they will be designated Class 5A on the South African Railways (SAR).
  - Two 6th Class 2-6-2 Prairie locomotives. In 1912 they will be designated Class 6Y on the SAR.
  - A second batch of 38 8th Class 4-8-0 Mastodon type locomotives, six on the Western, twenty on the Midland and twelve on the Eastern Systems. In 1912 they will be designated Class 8D on the SAR.
  - Four additional 8th Class 4-8-0 Mastodon type locomotives, built to modified specifications in order to accommodate a larger grate area. In 1912 they will be designated Class 8E on the SAR.
  - Four Cape 8th Class 2-8-0 Consolidation type locomotives. In 1912 they will be designated Class 8Y on the SAR.
  - Two 9th Class 2-8-2 Mikado steam locomotives. In 1912 they will be classified Class Experimental 4 on the SAR.
  - A single experimental 2-8-0 Consolidation type tandem compound steam locomotive. In 1912 it will be classified as Class Experimental 3 on the SAR.
  - A single experimental 0-6-0+0-6-0 Kitson-Meyer type articulated steam locomotive on the Eastern System.
  - A single small Krauss 0-4-0 side-tank locomotive, for use as construction engine on the narrow gauge Avontuur branch.
  - A single Krauss 0-6-0 tank locomotive, also for use as construction engine on the Avontuur branch.
- Two locomotives, later named Thebus and Stormberg, enter service with the Irrigation Department of the Public Works Department of the Cape Colony.

Transvaal

- Three new Cape gauge locomotive types enter service on the Central South African Railways (CSAR):
  - Six Reid Tenwheeler 4-10-2 tank locomotives are converted to a 4-8-2T configuration. In 1912 they will be designated Class H1 on the SAR.
  - Thirty Class 8-L2 4-8-0 Mastodon type locomotives. In 1912 they will be designated Class 8B on the SAR.
  - Thirty Class 8-L3 4-8-0 Mastodon type locomotives. In 1912 they will be designated Class 8C on the SAR.
