= 1902 in South Africa =

- Decades: 1880s; 1890s; 1900s; 1910s; 1920s
- See also: List of years in South Africa

The following lists events that happened during 1902 in South Africa.

== Incumbents ==
=== Cape Colony ===
- Governor of the Cape of Good Hope: Walter Hely-Hutchinson.
- Prime Minister of the Cape of Good Hope: John Gordon Sprigg.

=== Natal ===
- Governor of the Colony of Natal: Henry Edward McCallum.
- Prime Minister of the Colony of Natal: Albert Henry Hime.

=== Orange Free State / Orange River Colony ===
- State President of the Orange Free State: Martinus Theunis Steyn (until 31 May).
- Governor of the Orange River Colony and High Commissioner for Southern Africa: Alfred Milner, 1st Viscount Milner.
- Lieutenant-Governor of the Orange River Colony: Hamilton Goold-Adams.

=== South African Republic / Transvaal ===
- State President of the South African Republic: Paul Kruger (until 31 May) (in exile); Schalk Willem Burger (acting until 31 May).
- Governor of the Transvaal and High Commissioner for Southern Africa: Alfred Milner, 1st Viscount Milner.
- Lieutenant-Governor of the Transvaal: Sir Arthur Lawley.

== Events ==
February

- 27 – Breaker Morant and Peter Handcock are executed in Pretoria for the murder of Boer prisoners of war near Louis Trichardt.

March

- 7 – The Burghers win their last battle over British forces, with the capture of a British general and 200 of his men.

April

- 4 – The town Concordia in Namaqualand surrenders to Boer forces.
- 8 – O'okiep is besieged by Boer forces under General Jan Smuts.

May

- 1 – Boer commandos use the locomotive Pioneer to propel a truck-load of dynamite into the besieged O'okiep.
- 4 – Boer General Jan Smuts meets with the British General Herbert Kitchener at Kroonstad.
- 6 – Qulusi-Zulu chief Sikhobobo with a 300-strong impi attacks Field-cornet Potgieter and 70 Boers while sleeping, leaving 56 Burghers and 52 Zulus dead in the Battle of Holkrans.
- 31 – The Second Boer War ends with the signing of the Treaty of Vereeniging at Melrose House in Pretoria.

July

- James Stevenson-Hamilton is appointed warden of the Sabie Game Reserve.

December

- Mahatma Gandhi arrives in Durban from Bombay.

Unknown date

- James Stevenson-Hamilton is appointed the first warden of the Sabie Game Reserve.

== Births ==
- 1 January – Buster Nupen, South African cricketer. (d. 1977)

== Deaths ==
- 26 March – Cecil John Rhodes, businessman, mining magnate, imperialist and politician.
- 2 May – Jan Stephanus de Villiers, composer and organist, dies in Paarl.

== Railways ==
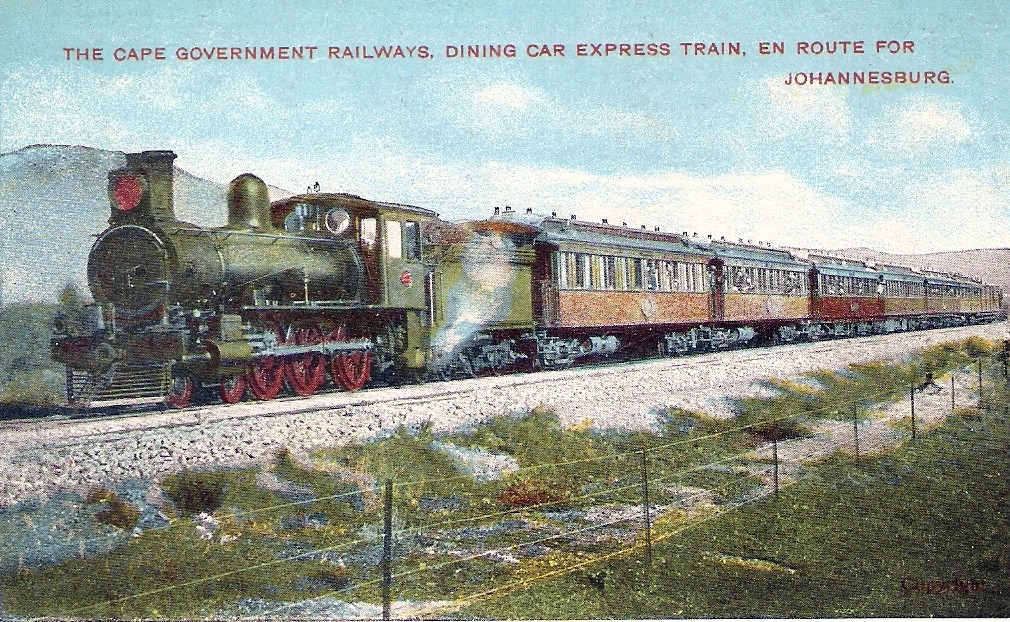
SAR Class 6J

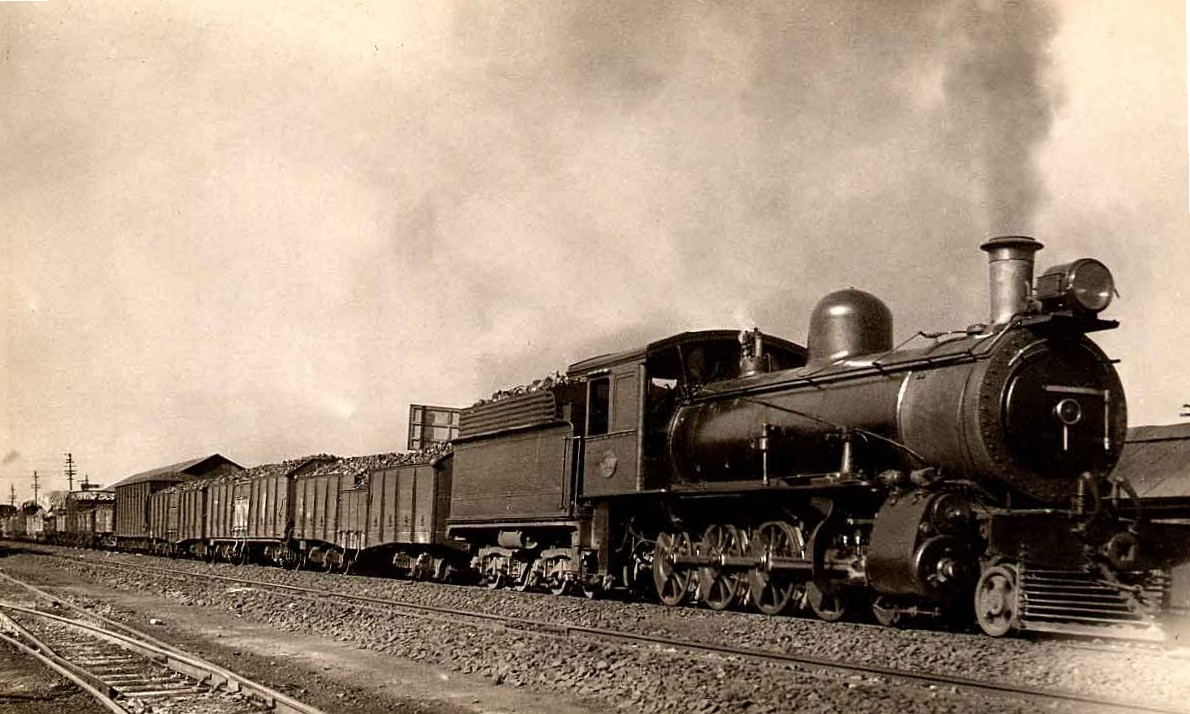
CGR 8th Class

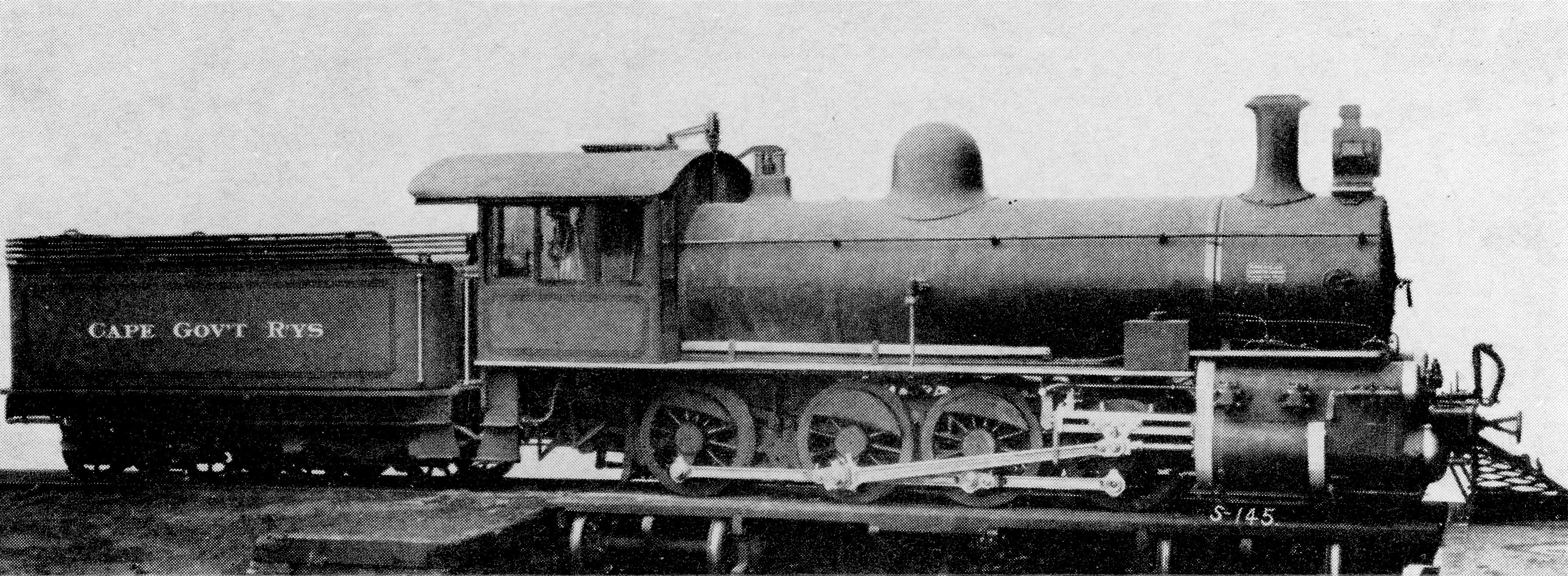
CGR Tandem Compound

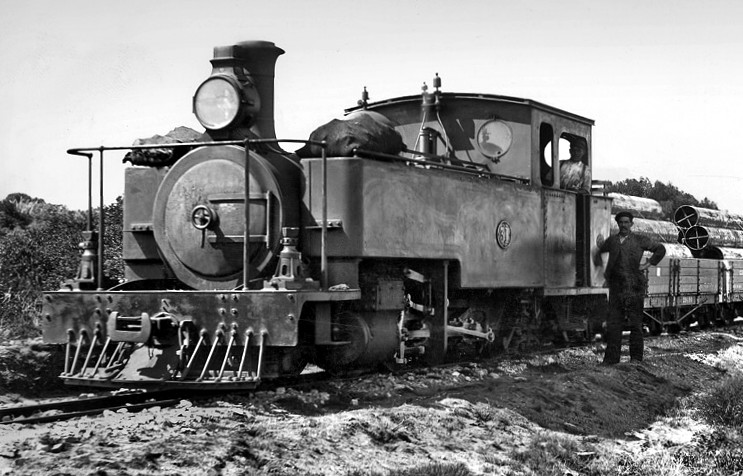
CGR Type A

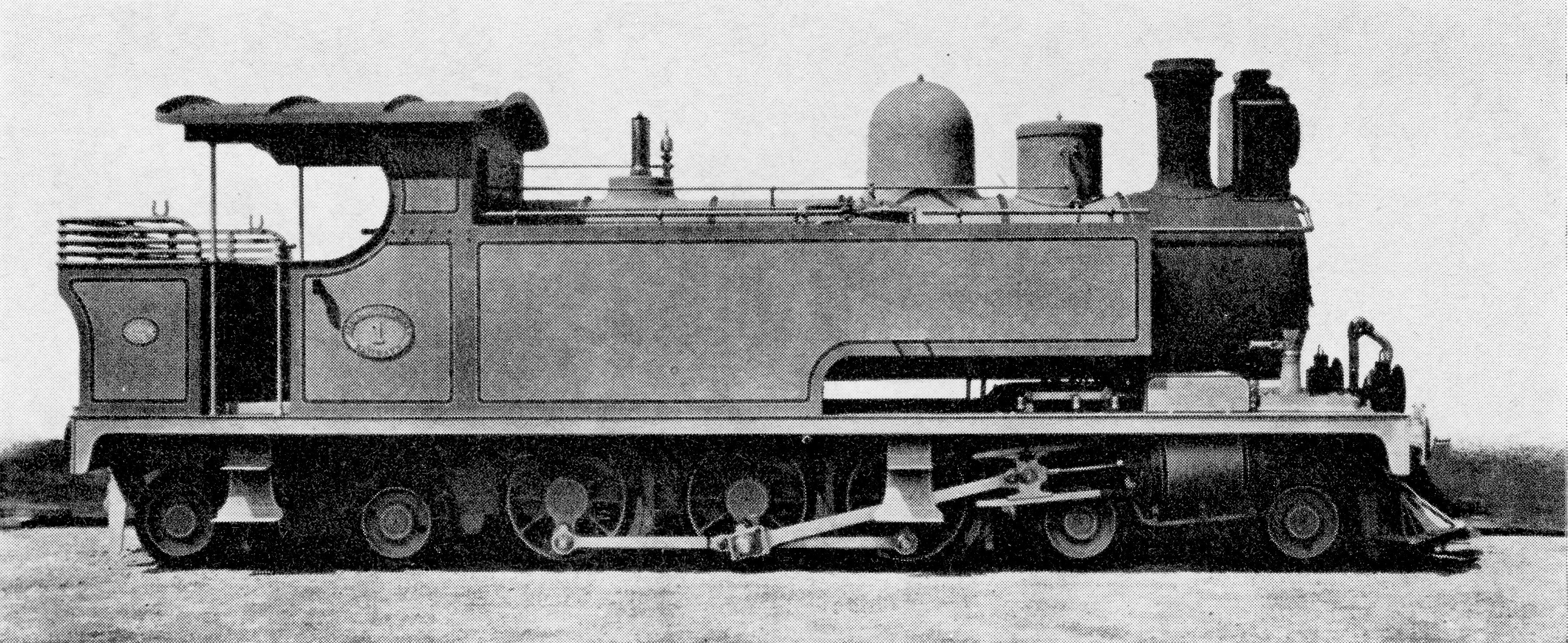
NGR Class F

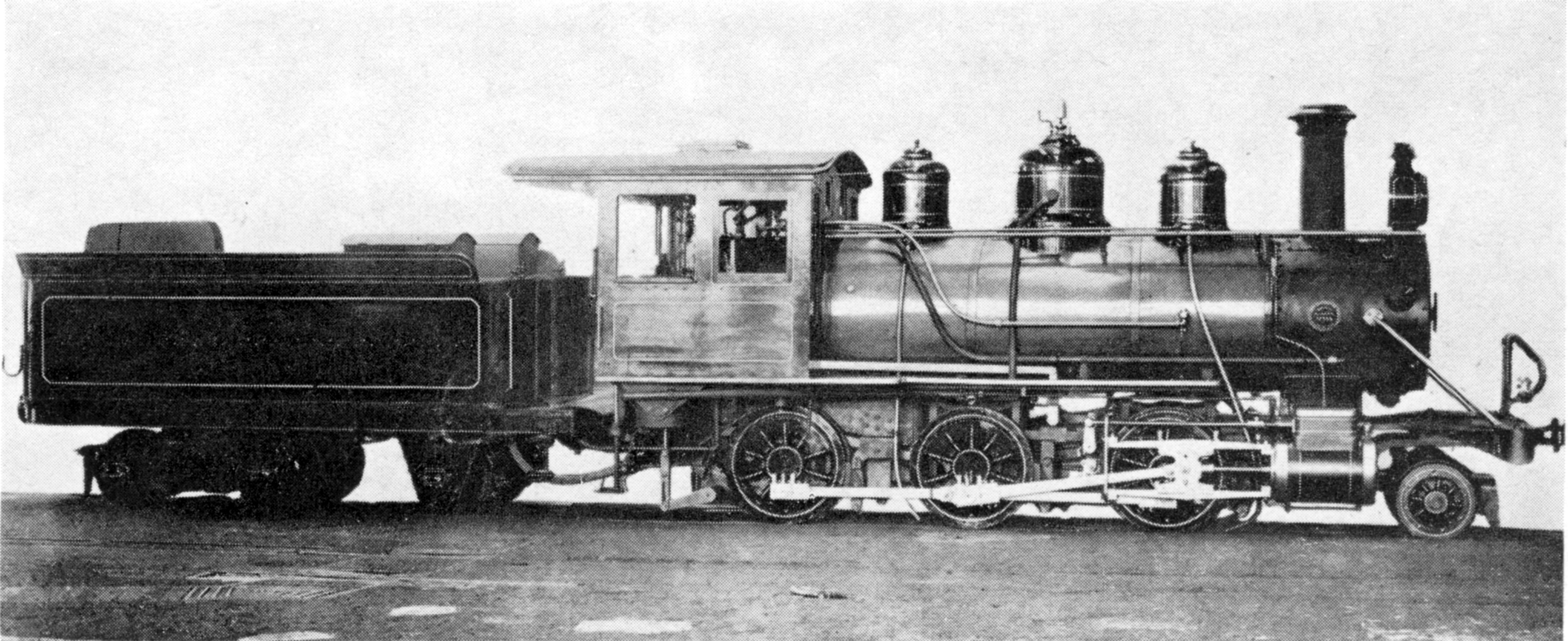
Zululand Railway Co. 2-6-0

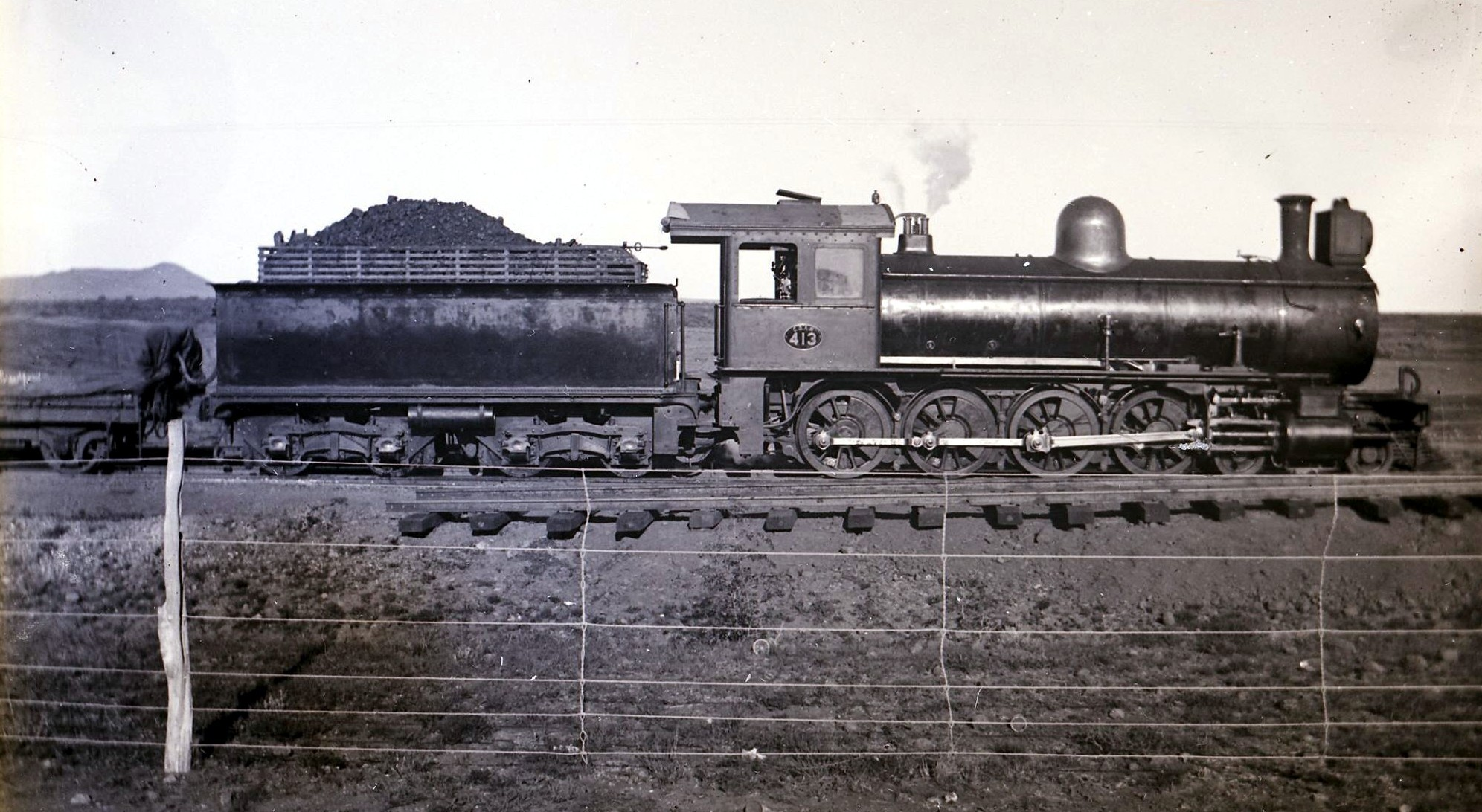
IMR 8th Class

=== Railway lines opened ===
- 1 May – Free State – Bloemfontein to Sannaspos, 21 miles 41 chains (34.6 kilometres).
- 18 July – Natal – Tugela to Mhlatuze, 44 miles 22 chains (71.3 kilometres).
- 1 August – Cape Midland – Cookhouse to Somerset East, 19 miles 35 chains (31.3 kilometres).
- 1 August – Cape Midland – Klipplaat to Willowmore, 62 miles (99.8 kilometres).
- 1 August – Cape Western – Sir Lowry's Pass Village to Caledon, 51 miles 75 chains (83.6 kilometres).
- 15 November – Cape Western – Moorreesburg to Eendekuil, 49 miles 43 chains (79.7 kilometres).

=== Locomotives ===
Cape

- Four new Cape gauge and three narrow gauge locomotive types enter service on the Cape Government Railways (CGR):
  - Fourteen 6th Class bar framed 4-6-0 passenger steam locomotives. In 1912 they will be designated Class 6J on the South African Railways (SAR).
  - The last ten 7th Class 4-8-0 Mastodon type locomotives on the Eastern System. In 1912 they will be designated Class 7C on the SAR.
  - The first thirteen of twenty-three 8th Class 4-8-0 Mastodon locomotives on the Western, Midland and Eastern Systems. In 1912 they will be designated Class 8 on the SAR.
  - A single experimental 2-8-0 "Consolidation" type tandem compound steam locomotive, in 1912 designated Class Experimental 2 on the SAR.
  - Three Type A 2-6-0 Mogul type steam locomotives, later to become Class NG7 on the SAR, on the Hopefield narrow gauge branchline that is being constructed from Kalbaskraal.
  - Two Type A 2-6-4T Adriatic type narrow gauge locomotives on construction service on the new Avontuur branch that is being built out of Port Elizabeth through the Langkloof.
  - A single Type C 0-4-0 narrow gauge tank steam locomotive named Midget on the Avontuur branch.
- Two new Cape gauge locomotive types enter service with the East London and Table Bay Harbour Boards:
  - Two 0-6-0 saddle-tank locomotives enter shunting service at the East London Harbour.
  - Eleven 2-6-0 saddle-tank locomotives enter harbour shunting service in Table Bay Harbour.

Natal

- The Natal Government Railways places ten Class F 4-6-4 Baltic type tank steam locomotives in service, the first known locomotive in the world to be designed and built as a Baltic. In 1912 they will be designated Class E on the SAR.
- The Natal Harbours Department places a single saddle-tank locomotive named Congella in service as harbour shunter in Durban Harbour.
- The Zululand Railway Company, contractors for the construction of the North Coast line from Verulam to the Tugela River, acquires two 2-6-0 Mogul type tender locomotives as construction engines, later to be designated Class I on the NGR.

Transvaal

- The Imperial Military Railways places forty Cape 8th Class 4-8-0 Mastodon type steam locomotives in service. In 1912 they will be designated Class 8A on the SAR.
