= CGR NG 0-4-0T =

South African steam locomotive

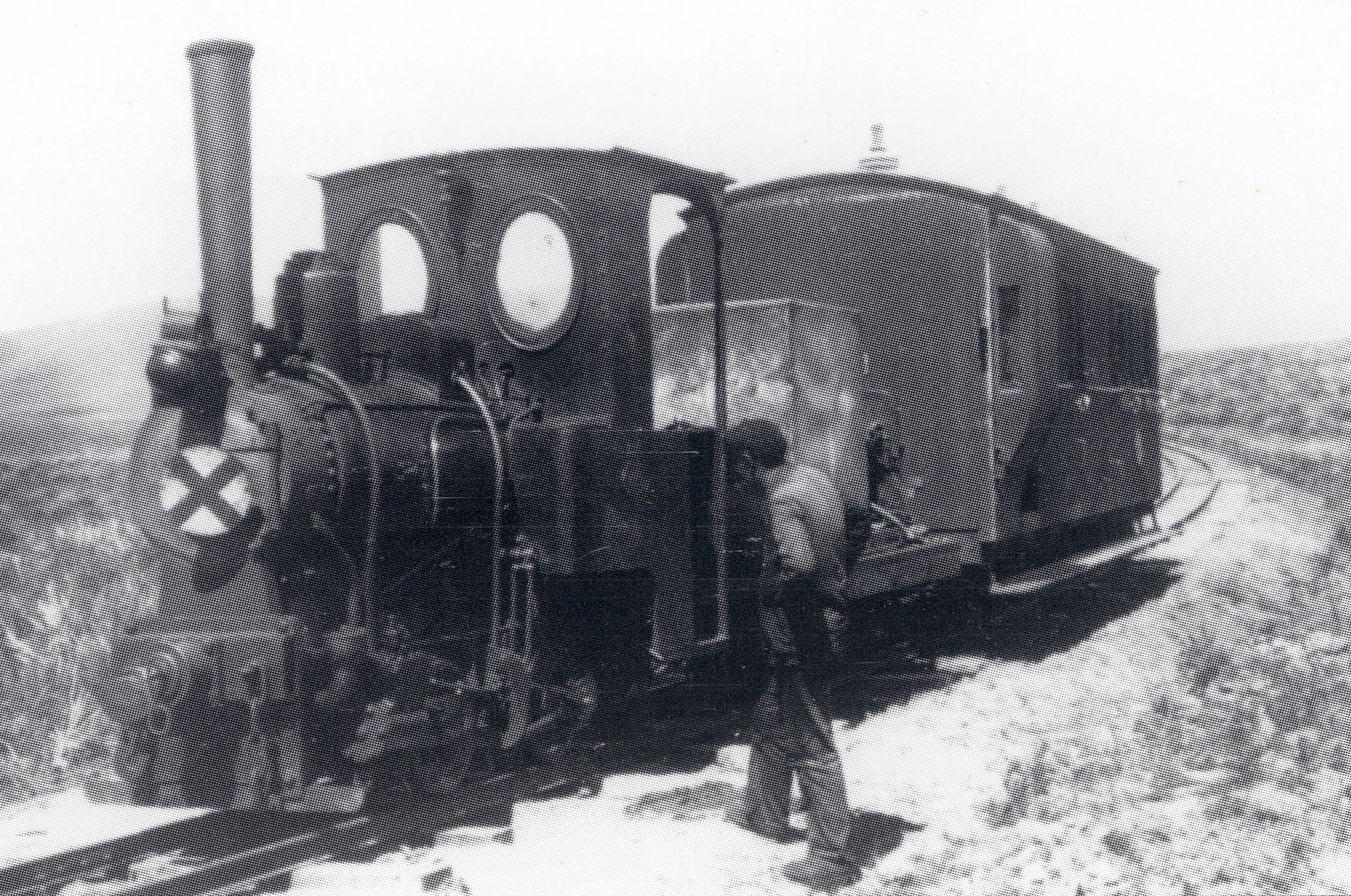
- CGR 0-4-0T with a makeshift water tender and coach
Type and origin
- Power type: Steam
- Designer: Krauss & Company
- Builder: Krauss & Company
- Serial number: 2479
- Build date: 1891
Specifications
- Configuration
  - Whyte: 0-4-0T
  - UIC: Bn2t
- Driver: 2nd coupled axle
- Gauge: 2 ft (610 mm) narrow
- Adhesive weight: 5 LT (5,080 kg)
- Loco weight: 5 LT (5,080 kg)
- Fuel type: Coal
- Firebox
  - Type: Round-top
- Cylinders: Two
- Valve gear: Stephenson
- Couplers: Buffer-and-chains
Career
- Operators: Cape Government Railways
- Number in class: 1
- Delivered: c. 1903
- First run: c. 1903

The Cape Government Railways NG 0-4-0T was a South African steam locomotive from the pre-Union era in the Cape of Good Hope.

The Cape Government Railways acquired a single small 0-4-0T side-tank locomotive for use as construction engine on the Avontuur branch, probably at the same time that it acquired its single 0-6-0T narrow-gauge steam locomotive No. NG21 in 1903.

== Manufacturer ==
A single locomotive, built by Krauss & Company, was purchased by the Cape Government Railways (CGR) c. 1903 and placed in service as construction engine on the narrow-gauge Avontuur branch out of Port Elizabeth.

According to the Krauss works records, the locomotive was built in 1891 with works number 2479 and delivered to "Baare, Berlin, f. Port Elizabeth". The engine's year of construction was more than a decade before construction work began on either the Hopefield or Avontuur narrow-gauge railway lines. Neither the original owner of the engine nor its actual year of arrival in Port Elizabeth is known.

== Service ==
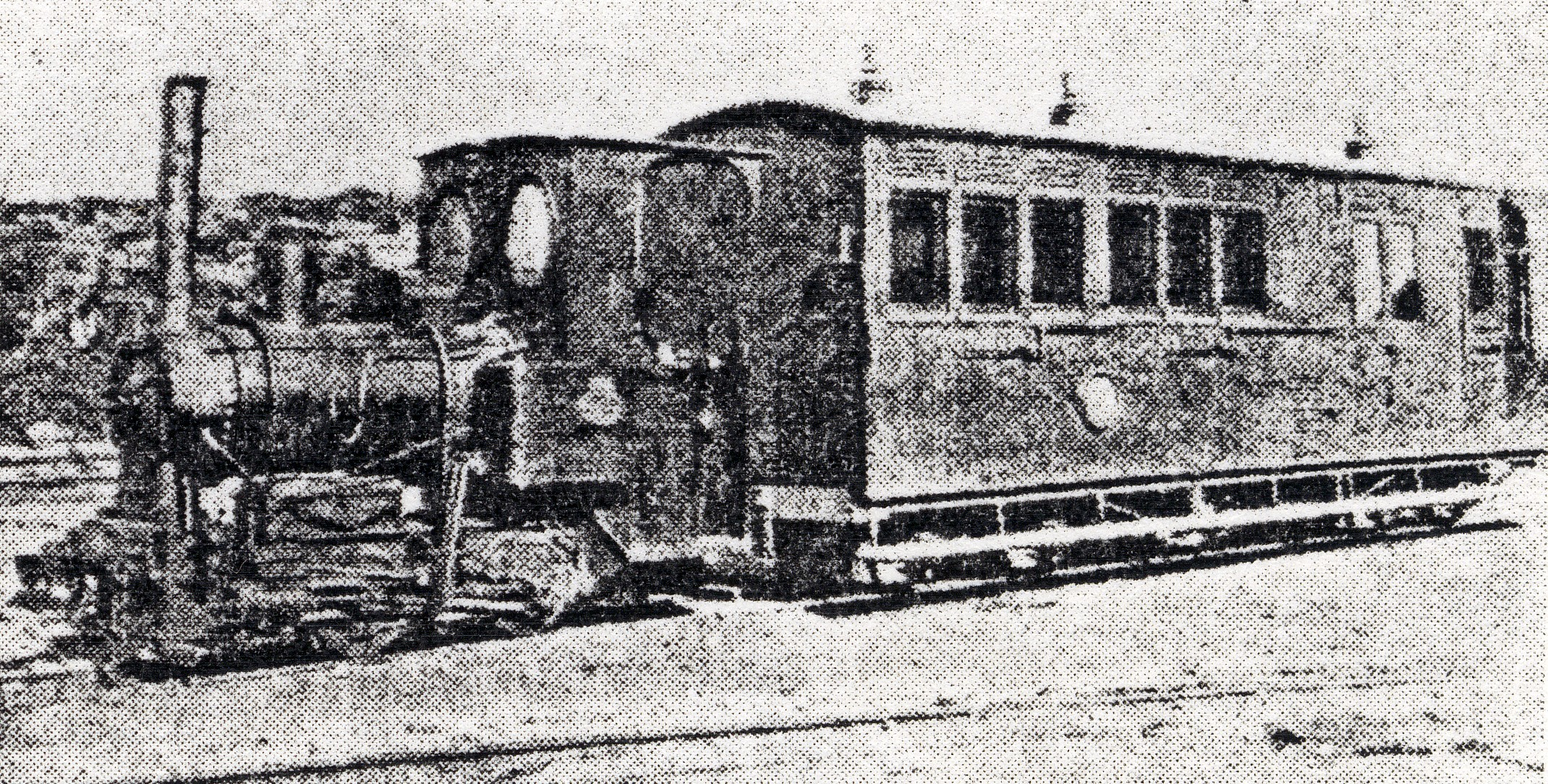

The engine weighed approximately 5 long tons (5 tonnes) in full working order. The main picture shows it hauling a makeshift water tender, consisting of a water tank on a two-axle goods truck, and a single passenger coach.

After completion of the Avontuur railway, the locomotive was occasionally used for picnic parties of from 12 to 20 persons. Its ultimate fate is not known, except that it was no longer in Railways service when the South African Railways renumbering scheme was executed in 1912.
