= South African Class Experimental 3 2-8-0 =

1903 design of steam locomotive

CGR Tandem Compound 2-8-0 1903 South African Class Experimental 3 2-8-0
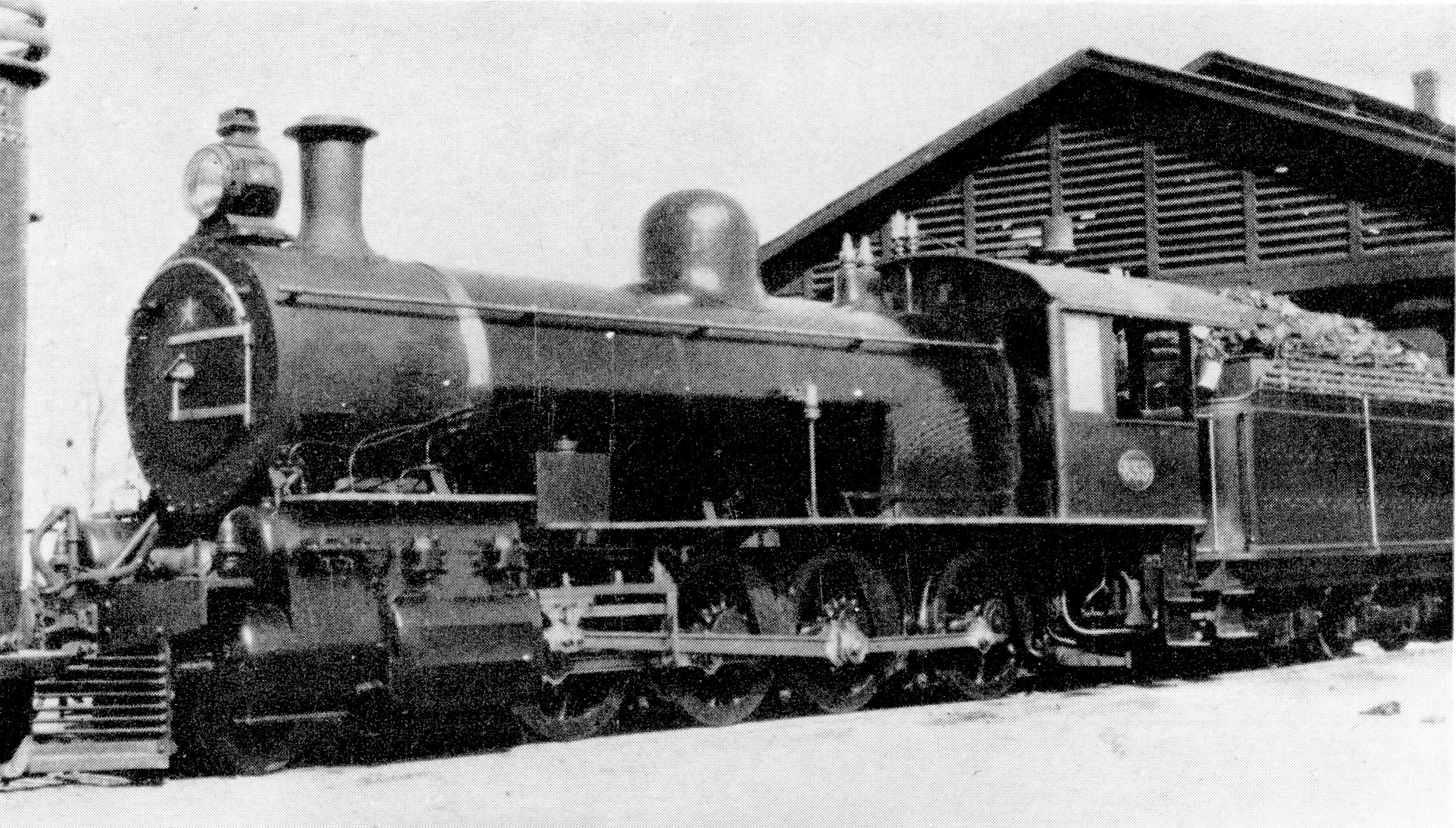
- CGR Tandem Compound no. 839; SAR Class Experimental 3 no. 909
Type and origin
- Power type: Steam
- Designer: Cape Government Railways (H.M. Beatty)
- Builder: American Locomotive Company
- Serial number: 28638
- Model: CGR Tandem Compound
- Build date: 1903
- Total produced: 1
Specifications
- Configuration
  - Whyte: 2-8-0 (Consolidation)
  - UIC: 1'Dnv4
- Driver: 3rd coupled axle
- Gauge: 3 ft 6 in (1,067 mm) Cape gauge
- Leading dia.: 28 1/2 in (724 mm)
- Coupled dia.: 48 in (1,219 mm)
- Tender wheels: 33 1/2 in (851 mm)
- Wheelbase: 46 ft 5 in (14,148 mm)
  - Axle spacing (Asymmetrical): 1-2: 4 ft 7 in (1,397 mm); 2-3: 4 ft 3 in (1,295 mm); 3-4: 5 ft 8 in (1,727 mm)
  - Engine: 22 ft 2 in (6,756 mm)
  - Coupled: 14 ft 6 in (4,420 mm)
  - Tender: 14 ft 5 in (4,394 mm)
  - Tender bogie: 5 ft (1,524 mm)
- Length
  - Over couplers: 53 ft 8 1/2 in (16,370 mm)
- Height: 12 ft 10 in (3,912 mm)
- Frame type: Bar
- Axle load: 14 LT (14,220 kg)
  - Leading: 7 LT 1 cwt (7,163 kg)
  - 1st coupled: 14 LT (14,220 kg)
  - 2nd coupled: 13 LT 2 cwt (13,310 kg)
  - 3rd coupled: 13 LT 3 cwt (13,360 kg)
  - 4th coupled: 12 LT 13 cwt (12,850 kg)
- Adhesive weight: 52.9 LT (53,750 kg)
- Loco weight: 59 LT 19 cwt (60,910 kg)
- Tender weight: 34 LT (34,550 kg)
- Total weight: 93 LT 19 cwt (95,460 kg)
- Tender type: 2-axle bogies
- Fuel type: Coal
- Fuel capacity: 6 LT (6.1 t)
- Water cap.: 3,080 imp gal (14,000 L)
- Firebox
  - Type: Round-top
  - Grate area: 31.3 sq ft (2.91 m^{2})
- Boiler
  - Pitch: 7 ft 5 in (2,261 mm)
  - Diameter: 4 ft 11 in (1,499 mm)
  - Tube plates: 12 ft 5 5/8 in (3,800 mm)
  - Small tubes: 200: 2 in (51 mm)
- Boiler pressure: 200 psi (1,379 kPa)
- Safety valve: Ramsbottom
- Heating surface
  - Firebox: 107 sq ft (9.9 m^{2})
  - Tubes: 1,306 sq ft (121.3 m^{2})
  - Total surface: 1,413 sq ft (131.3 m^{2})
- Cylinders: Four
- High-pressure cylinder: 13 in (330 mm) bore 26 in (660 mm) stroke
- Low-pressure cylinder: 23 in (584 mm) bore 26 in (660 mm) stroke
- Valve gear: Stephenson
- Valve type: Piston
- Couplers: Johnston link-and-pin
Performance figures
- Tractive effort: 26,400 lbf (117 kN) @ 75%
Career
- Operators: Cape Government Railways; South African Railways; Transvaal and Natal Collieries
- Class: SAR Class Experimental 3
- Number in class: 1
- Numbers: CGR 839, SAR 909
- Delivered: 1903
- First run: 1903
- Withdrawn: 1920
- The 2nd and 3rd coupled axles had flangeless wheels

The South African Railways Class Experimental 3 2-8-0 of 1903 was a steam locomotive from the pre-Union era in the Cape of Good Hope.

In 1903, the Cape Government Railways placed a single experimental 2-8-0 Consolidation type tandem compound steam locomotive in service, based on its Schenectady-built 8th Class of 1901. It was similar to the tandem compound locomotive which had been delivered a year earlier, but with a larger firegrate and an increased heating surface. In 1912, when the locomotive was assimilated into the South African Railways, it was renumbered and designated Class Experimental 3.

== Manufacturer ==
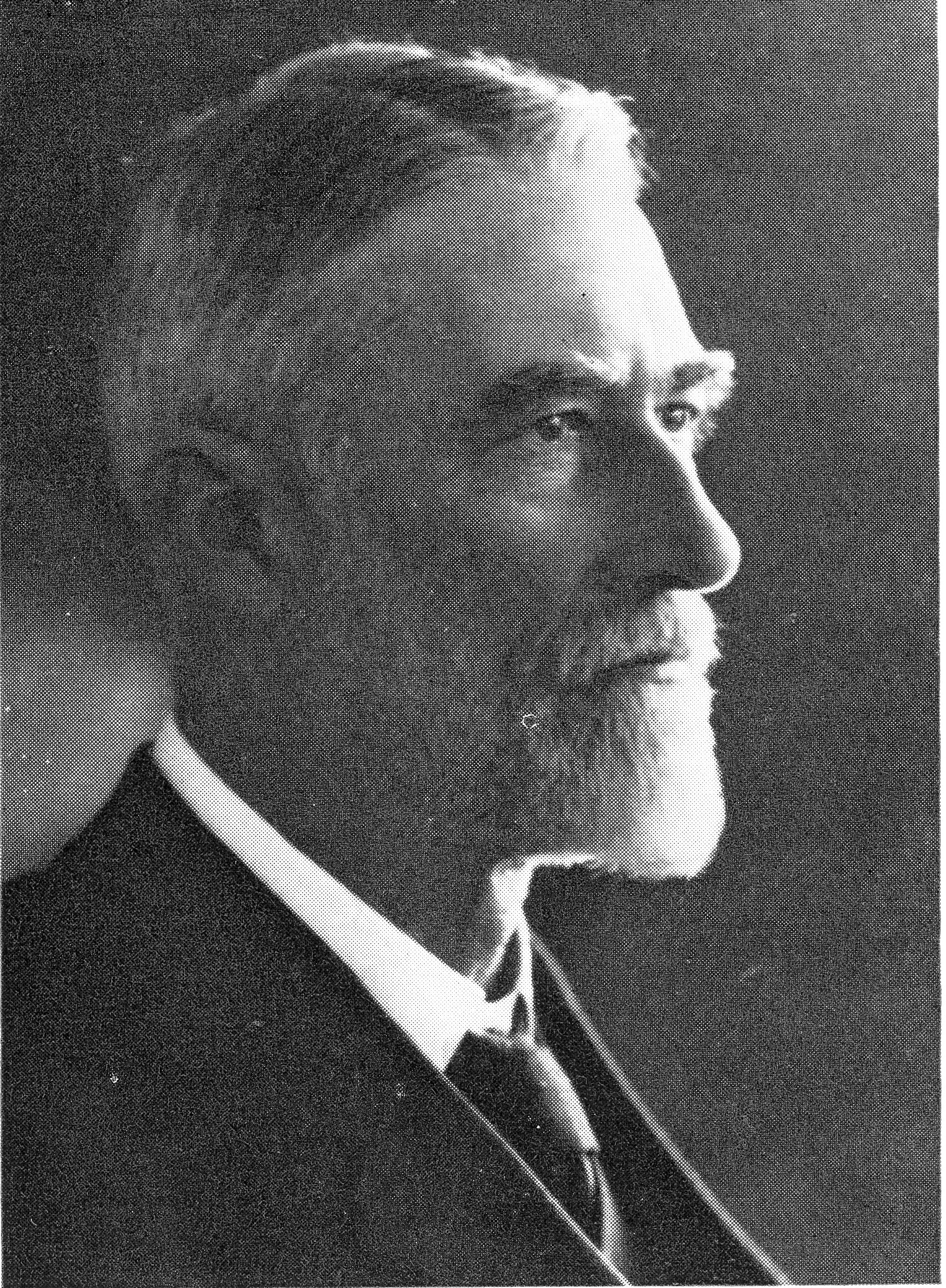
H.M. Beatty

In the first few years of the twentieth century, Cape Government Railways (CGR) Chief Locomotive Superintendent H.M. Beatty experimented with various forms of compound steam locomotives. The second of these experimental locomotives was delivered by the American Locomotive Company (ALCO) in 1903. Like CGR no. 804, the first experimental CGR tandem compound locomotive which had been delivered the year before, it was based on the CGR's Schenectady-built 8th Class of 1901. It was numbered 839, but it was not classified by the CGR and was simply referred to as the Tandem Compound.

== Compound expansion ==
=== Compound locomotive ===
In a compound locomotive, steam is expanded in phases. After being expanded in a high-pressure cylinder and having then lost pressure and given up part of its heat, it is exhausted into a larger-volume low-pressure cylinder for secondary expansion, after which it is exhausted through the smokebox. By comparison, in the more usual arrangement of simple expansion (simplex), steam is expanded just once in any one cylinder before being exhausted through the smokebox.

=== Tandem compound ===
The tandem compound locomotive first appeared on the American Erie Railroad in 1867. In a tandem compound engine, each pair of high- and low-pressure cylinders drove a common crosshead, connecting rod and crank. The high-pressure cylinders were bolted onto the fronts of the low-pressure cylinders, which were usually each cast integrally with one half of the smokebox saddle. The hollow piston valves were mounted on the same valve spindle in a common steam chest, with the high-pressure valves arranged for inside admission and the low-pressure valves for outside admission.

== Characteristics ==
The locomotive was similar to CGR no. 804, the tandem compound which had been delivered to the CGR in 1902 and which was later designated Class Experimental 2, but it had a larger and improved firebox design and an increased heating surface which enhanced its steaming ability. The firegrate area had been increased from 20 to 31.3 square feet (1.858 to 2.908 square metres) and the total heating surface from 1,409.4 to 1,413 square feet (130.938 to 131.272 square metres). However, it suffered from similar mechanical weaknesses as its predecessor.

The high-pressure cylinders were 13 inches (330 millimetres) and the low-pressure cylinders 23 inches (584 millimetres) in diameter, with a common stroke of 26 inches (660 millimetres). The steam was admitted to the same side of each piston simultaneously by means of an intricate system of crossed ports in the high-pressure cylinder casting to convey its spent steam to the low-pressure cylinder, from where it was then exhausted after use.

== Performance ==
Considerable trouble was experienced with the tandem arrangement, since the piston rod packing between the high- and low-pressure cylinders could not be inspected or serviced without removing the high-pressure cylinder. In addition, as a result of high levels of condensation, the low-pressure cylinders were inefficient since the drain cocks had to be opened frequently enough to detract from the locomotive's otherwise good performance.

== Service ==
The locomotive was placed in service on the lower section of the Cape mainline.

When the Union of South Africa was established on 31 May 1910, the three Colonial government railways (CGR, Natal Government Railways and Central South African Railways) were united under a single administration to control and administer the railways, ports and harbours of the Union. Although the South African Railways and Harbours came into existence in 1910, the actual classification and renumbering of all the rolling stock of the three constituent railways were only implemented with effect from 1 January 1912.

In 1912, the locomotive was designated Class Experimental 3 and renumbered to 909 on the SAR. Unlike the predecessor Class Experimental 2, it was never modified and remained in service as a tandem compound until it was withdrawn and sold to the Transvaal and Natal Collieries in 1920.
