= CGR 2-6-0ST 1902 =

Type of steam locomotive

Table Bay Harbour 2-6-0ST 1902 CGR 2-6-0ST 1902 South African 2-6-0ST 1902
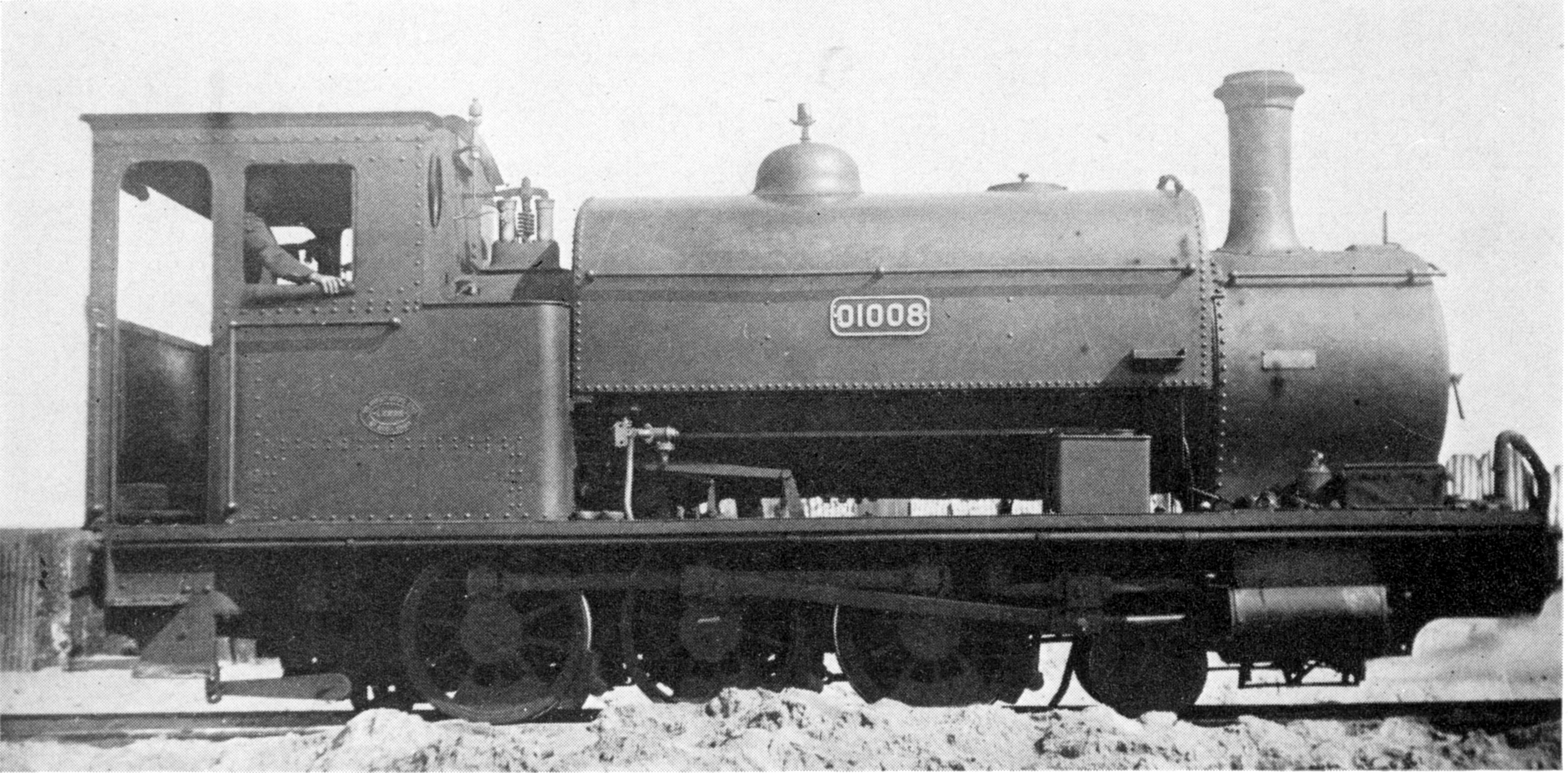
- Table Bay Harbour no. 25, CGR no. 1008, SAR no. 01008, c. 1930
Type and origin
- Power type: Steam
- Designer: Hunslet Engine Company
- Builder: Hunslet Engine Company
- Serial number: 766–770, 815–820
- Build date: 1901–1903
- Total produced: 11
Specifications
- Configuration
  - Whyte: 2-6-0ST (Mogul)
  - UIC: 1Cn2t
- Driver: 2nd coupled axle
- Gauge: 3 ft 6 in (1,067 mm) Cape gauge
- Leading dia.: 24 in (610 mm)
- Coupled dia.: 39 in (991 mm)
- Wheelbase: 10 ft 9 in (3,277 mm)
  - Coupled: 7 ft 2 in (2,184 mm)
- Length
  - Over couplers: 25 ft 3 1/2 in (7,709 mm)
- Height: 11 ft 3 5/8 in (3,445 mm)
- Axle load: 8 LT 12 cwt (8,738 kg)
  - Leading: 6 LT 13 cwt (6,757 kg)
  - 1st coupled: 6 LT 12 cwt (6,706 kg)
  - 2nd coupled: 8 LT 8 cwt (8,535 kg)
  - 3rd coupled: 8 LT 12 cwt (8,738 kg)
- Adhesive weight: 23 LT 12 cwt (23,980 kg)
- Loco weight: 30 LT 5 cwt (30,740 kg)
- Fuel type: Coal
- Fuel capacity: 1 LT 5 cwt (1.3 t)
- Water cap.: 600 imp gal (2,730 L)
- Firebox
  - Type: Round-top
  - Grate area: 10.43 sq ft (0.969 m^{2})
- Boiler
  - Pitch: 6 ft (1,829 mm)
  - Diameter: 3 ft 6 1/2 in (1,080 mm) outside
  - Tube plates: 9 ft 2 in (2,794 mm)
  - Small tubes: 124: 1 3/4 in (44 mm)
- Boiler pressure: 180 psi (1,241 kPa)
- Safety valve: Ramsbottom
- Heating surface
  - Firebox: 63 sq ft (5.9 m^{2})
  - Tubes: 533 sq ft (49.5 m^{2})
  - Total surface: 596 sq ft (55.4 m^{2})
- Cylinders: Two
- Cylinder size: 13 in (330 mm) bore 20 in (508 mm) stroke
- Valve gear: Stephenson
- Couplers: Johnston link-and-pin
Performance figures
- Tractive effort: 11,700 lbf (52 kN) @ 75%
Career
- Operators: Table Bay Harbour Board; Cape Government Railways; South African Railways
- Number in class: 11
- Numbers: TBHB 18-28, CGR 1001-1011, SAR 01001-01011
- Nicknames: Pug
- Delivered: 1902–1904
- First run: 1902
- Withdrawn: 1935

The Cape Government Railways 2-6-0ST of 1902 was a South African steam locomotive from the pre-Union era in the Cape of Good Hope.

Between 1902 and 1904, eleven 2-6-0 Mogul type saddle-tank locomotives entered shunting service at the Table Bay Harbour in Cape Town. They were taken onto the Cape Government Railways roster in 1909. All of them were still in service when the South African Railways was established in 1912.

== Manufacturer ==
Eleven 2-6-0 saddle-tank locomotives were delivered from Hunslet Engine Company to the Table Bay Harbour Board between 1902 and 1904. They were numbered in the range from 18 to 28 and entered service as harbour shunting engines at Table Bay Harbour in Cape Town.

== Service ==
=== Table Bay Harbour Board ===
Prior to 1908, each of the harbours of Cape Town, Port Elizabeth and East London was controlled by a board of directors and, as far as locomotives were concerned, each board purchased its own engines.

=== Cape Government Railways ===
In terms of Act 38 of 1908, the Cape Government Railways (CGR) became responsible for the administration of the three major harbours in the Cape of Good Hope with effect from 1 January 1909. The eleven locomotives at Table Bay Harbour in Cape Town were therefore all taken onto the CGR roster, renumbered in the range from 1001 to 1011.

=== South African Railways ===
When the Union of South Africa was established on 31 May 1910, the three Colonial government railways (CGR, Natal Government Railways and Central South African Railways) were united under a single administration to control and administer the railways, ports and harbours of the Union. Although the South African Railways and Harbours came into existence in 1910, the actual classification and renumbering of all the rolling stock of the three constituent railways were only implemented with effect from 1 January 1912.

In 1912, the locomotives were considered obsolete by the SAR, even though they were only eight years old. As obsolete stock, they were renumbered by having the numeral "0" prefixed to their existing numbers.

=== First World War ===
In 1915, shortly after the outbreak of the First World War, the German South West Africa colony was occupied by the Union Defence Forces. Since a large part of the territory's railway infrastructure and rolling stock was destroyed or damaged by retreating German forces, an urgent need arose for locomotives for use on the Cape gauge lines in that territory. In 1917, numbers 01003 and 01010 were transferred to the Defence Department for service in South West Africa. Both locomotives were returned to South Africa after the war.

Despite being considered obsolete, six of the locomotives remained in service until 1935 before being withdrawn and scrapped. In SAR service, all of them were transferred away from Table Bay Harbour. Five went to Durban, four to Port Elizabeth and two as workshop shunting engines to Bloemfontein.

== Works numbers ==
The works numbers, ex works dates, original numbers, renumbering, distribution and scrapping dates of the Table Bay Harbour Board's 2-6-0ST of 1902 are listed in the table.

CGR 2-6-0ST of 1902
Works no.	Ex works date	TBHB no.	CGR no.	SAR no.	Transferred to	Scrap date
766	1901–12	18	1001	01001	Durban	1935–02
767	1901–12	19	1002	01002	Port Elizabeth	1930–05
768	1902–01	20	1003	01003	Durban	1935–02
769	1902–03	21	1004	01004	Port Elizabeth	1929–06
770	1902–03	22	1005	01005	Port Elizabeth	1929–06
815	1903–06	23	1006	01006	Bloemfontein	1932–09
816	1903–06	24	1007	01007	Durban	1935–02
817	1903–07	25	1008	01008	Durban	1935–02
818	1903–07	26	1009	01009	Port Elizabeth	1932–01
819	1903–09	27	1010	01010	Bloemfontein	1935–01
820	1903–10	28	1011	01011	Durban	1935–01
