= South African Class Experimental 2 2-8-0 =

1902 design of steam locomotive

CGR Tandem Compound 2-8-0 1902 South African Class Experimental 2 2-8-0
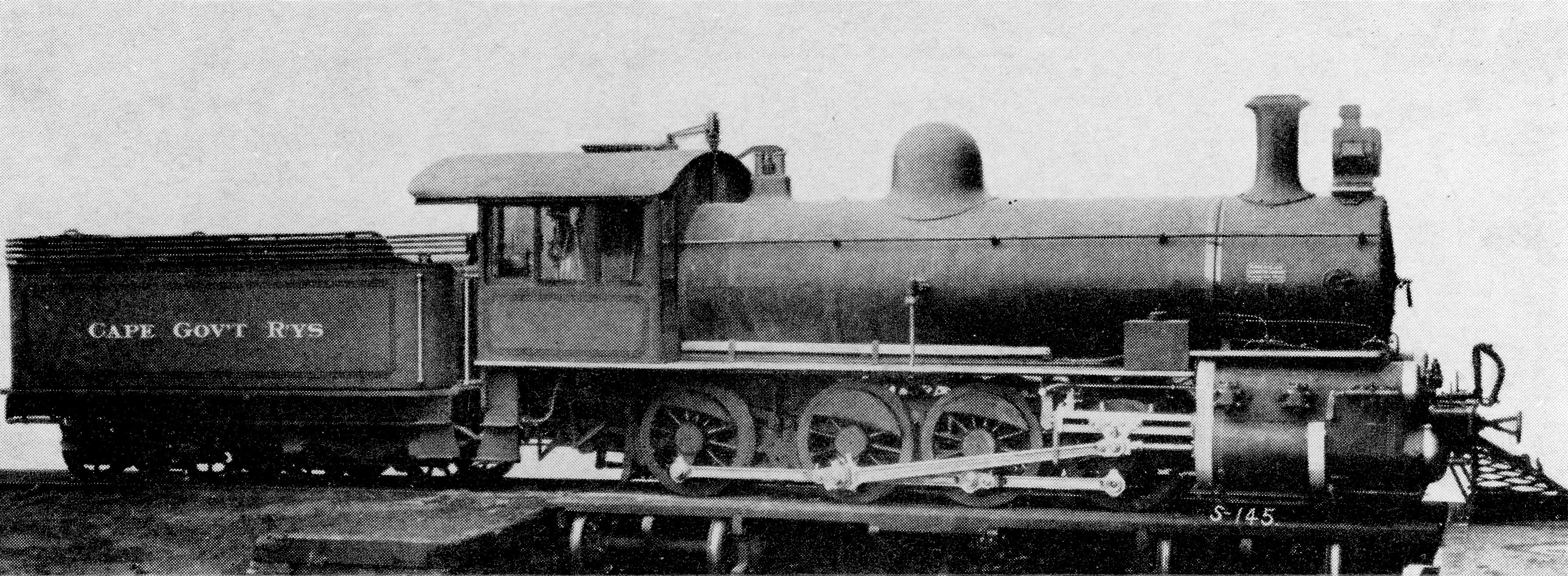
- CGR Tandem Compound Consolidation no. 804; SAR Class Experimental 2 no. 908
Type and origin
- Power type: Steam
- Designer: Cape Government Railways (H.M. Beatty)
- Builder: American Locomotive Company
- Serial number: 26694
- Model: CGR Tandem Compound
- Build date: 1902
- Total produced: 1
Specifications
- Configuration
  - Whyte: 2-8-0 (Consolidation)
  - UIC: 1'Dnv4 as built 1'Dn2 modified
- Driver: 3rd coupled axle
- Gauge: 3 ft 6 in (1,067 mm) Cape gauge
- Leading dia.: 28 1/2 in (724 mm)
- Coupled dia.: 48 in (1,219 mm)
- Tender wheels: 33.5 in (851 mm)
- Wheelbase: 46 ft 5 in (14,148 mm)
  - Axle spacing (Asymmetrical): 1-2: 4 ft 7 in (1,397 mm); 2-3: 4 ft 3 in (1,295 mm); 3-4: 5 ft 8 in (1,727 mm)
  - Engine: 22 ft 2 in (6,756 mm)
  - Coupled: 14 ft 6 in (4,420 mm)
  - Tender: 14 ft 5 in (4,394 mm)
  - Tender bogie: 5 ft (1,524 mm)
- Length
  - Over couplers: 53 ft 8 in (16,358 mm)
- Height: 12 ft 10 in (3,912 mm)
- Frame type: Bar
- Axle load: 14 LT (14,220 kg)
  - Leading: 6 LT 13 cwt (6,757 kg)
  - 1st coupled: 14 LT (14,220 kg)
  - 2nd coupled: 13 LT (13,210 kg)
  - 3rd coupled: 12 LT 15 cwt (12,950 kg)
  - 4th coupled: 11 LT 8 cwt (11,580 kg)
- Adhesive weight: 51 LT 3 cwt (51,970 kg)
- Loco weight: 57 LT 16 cwt (58,730 kg)
- Tender weight: 34 LT (34,550 kg)
- Total weight: 91 LT 16 cwt (93,270 kg)
- Tender type: 2-axle bogies
- Fuel type: Coal
- Fuel capacity: 6 LT (6.1 t)
- Water cap.: 3,080 imp gal (14,000 L)
- Firebox
  - Type: Round-top
  - Grate area: 20 sq ft (1.9 m^{2})
- Boiler
  - Pitch: 7 ft 1 in (2,159 mm)
  - Diameter: 4 ft 11 in (1,499 mm)
  - Tube plates: 12 ft 5 5/8 in (3,800 mm)
  - Small tubes: 196: 2 in (51 mm)
- Boiler pressure: 200 psi (1,379 kPa)
- Safety valve: Ramsbottom
- Heating surface
  - Firebox: 129.8 sq ft (12.06 m^{2})
  - Tubes: 1,279.6 sq ft (118.88 m^{2})
  - Total surface: 1,409.4 sq ft (130.94 m^{2})
- Cylinders: Four as built, two when modified
- High-pressure cylinder: 13 in (330 mm) bore 26 in (660 mm) stroke
- Low-pressure cylinder: 23 in (584 mm) bore 26 in (660 mm) stroke
- Valve gear: Stephenson
- Couplers: Johnston link-and-pin
Performance figures
- Tractive effort: 26,400 lbf (117 kN) @ 75%
Career
- Operators: Cape Government Railways; South African Railways
- Class: CGR Tandem Compound; SAR Class Experimental 2
- Number in class: 1
- Numbers: CGR 804, SAR 908
- Delivered: 1902
- First run: 1902
- Withdrawn: 1916
- The 2nd & 3rd coupled axles had flangeless wheels

The South African Railways Class Experimental 2 2-8-0 of 1902 was a steam locomotive from the pre-Union era in the Cape of Good Hope.

In 1902, the Cape Government Railways placed a single experimental 2-8-0 Consolidation type tandem compound steam locomotive in service, based on its Schenectady-built 8th Class of 1901. In 1912, when the locomotive was assimilated into the South African Railways, it was renumbered and designated Class Experimental 2.

== Manufacturer ==
In the first few years of the twentieth century, the Mechanical Department of the Cape Government Railways (CGR) was hard pressed for heavier locomotives, since train loads had outgrown the power of the locomotives of the day and double-heading of trains had become common.

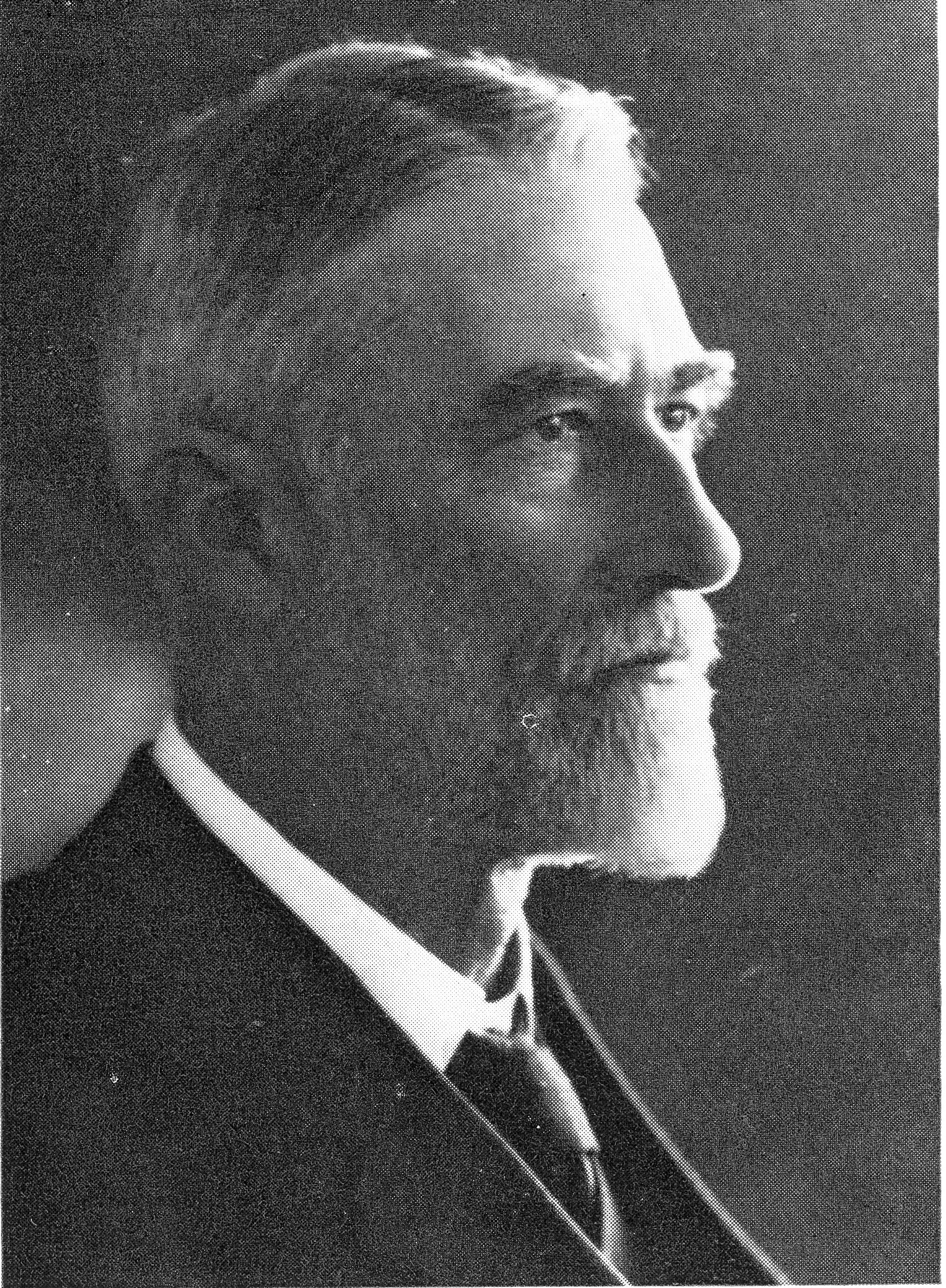
H.M. Beatty

H.M. Beatty, Locomotive Superintendent of the CGR, therefore began a series of experiments and tests with various designs of both British and American locomotives, one of which was with different versions of compound steam locomotives.

The first of these experimental engines was delivered by the American Locomotive Company (ALCO) in 1902. Its overall design was based on the CGR's Schenectady-built 8th Class of the previous year, later the Class 8X on the South African Railways (SAR), but it was built as a tandem compound locomotive. It was numbered 804, but was not classified by the CGR and was simply referred to as the Tandem Compound.

== Compound expansion ==
=== Compound locomotive ===
In a compound locomotive, steam is expanded in phases. After being expanded in a high-pressure cylinder and having then lost pressure and given up part of its heat, it is exhausted into a larger-volume low-pressure cylinder for secondary expansion, after which it is exhausted through the smokebox. By comparison, in the more usual arrangement of simple expansion (simplex), steam is expanded just once in any one cylinder before being exhausted through the smokebox.

=== Tandem compound ===
The tandem compound locomotive first appeared on the American Erie Railroad in 1867. In a tandem compound engine, each pair of high- and low-pressure cylinders drove a common crosshead, connecting rod and crank. The high-pressure cylinders were bolted onto the fronts of the low-pressure cylinders, which were usually each cast integrally with one half of the smokebox saddle. The hollow piston valves were mounted on the same valve spindle in a common steam chest, with the high-pressure valves arranged for inside admission and the low-pressure valves for outside admission.

== Characteristics ==
The CGR Tandem Compound's boiler was built in accordance with normal American practice and had the steam dome arranged on the last ring of the boiler barrel, just ahead of the firebox, as opposed to the British practice of locating the dome approximately atop the centre of the boiler barrel. The firebox had an inside width of 2 feet 4 1/2 inches (724 millimetres) and a length of 8 feet 5 9/16 inches (2,580 millimetres).

The patented type of tandem compound cylinders were arranged outside the bar frame. The high-pressure cylinders, in front, were 13 inches (330 millimetres) in diameter, while the low-pressure cylinders, arranged behind, were 23 inches (584 millimetres) in diameter, with a common stroke of 26 inches (660 millimetres). Each cylinder, with its valve chest, was cast separately and separate from the saddle casting. The high-pressure cylinders were bolted onto the front of the low-pressure cylinders which, in turn, were bolted onto the saddle casting which was fitted to the main bar frame.

The valve for the high-pressure cylinder was arranged for internal admission, while the valve for the low-pressure cylinder was arranged for external admission. Steam was admitted to the same side of each piston simultaneously, by means of an intricate system of crossed ports in the high-pressure cylinder casting to convey its spent steam to the low-pressure cylinder, from where it was then exhausted after use.

A starting valve, secured to the side of the steam chest over the high-pressure cylinder, was directly connected to the steam passages of the high-pressure cylinder but, upon starting, permitted boiler steam to pass directly to the low-pressure cylinders as well. A small by-pass valve for the high-pressure cylinder was contained in the casing of the starting valve. The low-pressure cylinders were also provided with by-pass valves.

== Performance ==
In service, considerable trouble was experienced with the tandem arrangement since the piston rod packing between the high- and low-pressure cylinders could not be inspected or serviced without removing the high-pressure cylinders. Lubrication of the packing bushes also proved difficult, with the result that the piston rods wore rapidly. In addition, as a result of high levels of condensation, the low-pressure cylinders were inefficient since the drain cocks had to be opened frequently enough to detract from the locomotive's otherwise good performance.

== Modification ==
Comparative tests were carried out between the Tandem Compound and a similar simplex locomotive, and showed no economy in fuel consumption. Beatty was apparently not greatly impressed with the Tandem Compound and it was not long before he had the compound cylinders removed to convert the locomotive to a simplex engine. Subsequent events showed that no real overall economy is obtainable from compound locomotives under South African conditions when all costs, including those of repairs and maintenance, are taken into account.

== Service ==
=== Cape Government Railways ===
The locomotive was placed in service on the lower section of the Cape mainline, where it was used with limited success until it was converted to simplex steaming.

=== South African Railways ===
When the Union of South Africa was established on 31 May 1910, the three Colonial government railways (CGR, Natal Government Railways and Central South African Railways) were united under a single administration to control and administer the railways, ports and harbours of the Union. Although the South African Railways and Harbours came into existence in 1910, the actual classification and renumbering of all the rolling stock of the three constituent railways were only implemented with effect from 1 January 1912.

In 1912, the locomotive was designated Class Experimental 2 and renumbered to 908 on the SAR. It remained in SAR service only until 1916, when it was withdrawn and scrapped.
