= CGR NG 0-6-0T =

South African steam locomotive

CGR NG 0-6-0T South African NG 0-6-0T
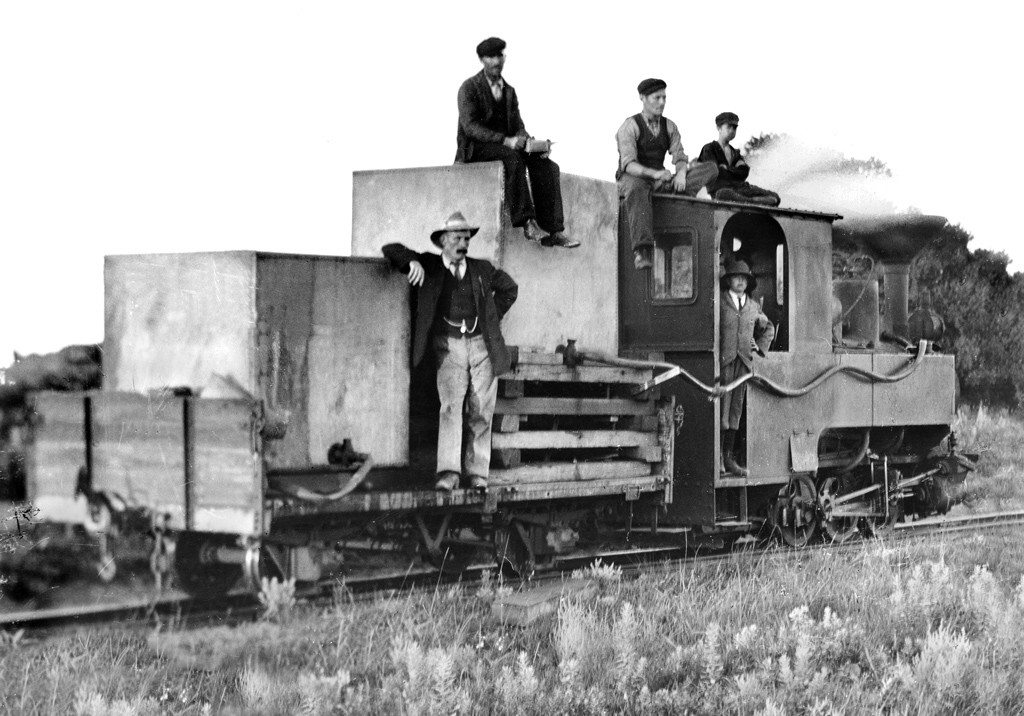
- No. NG21 with a makeshift water tender
Type and origin
- Power type: Steam
- Designer: Krauss & Company
- Builder: Krauss & Company
- Serial number: 4830
- Model: Krauss XXVIIab
- Build date: 1902
Specifications
- Configuration
  - Whyte: 0-6-0T
  - UIC: Cn2t
- Driver: 3rd coupled axle
- Gauge: 2 ft (610 mm) narrow
- Adhesive weight: 9 LT (9,144 kg)
- Loco weight: 9 LT (9,144 kg)
- Fuel type: Coal
- Firebox
  - Type: Round-top
- Boiler pressure: 160 psi (1,103 kPa)
- Cylinders: Two
- Cylinder size: 9 7/8 in (251 mm) bore 12 in (305 mm) stroke
- Valve gear: Stephenson
- Couplers: Bell-and-hook
Performance figures
- Tractive effort: 6,207 lbf (27.61 kN) @ 75%
Career
- Operators: Cape Government Railways; South African Railways
- Number in class: 1
- Numbers: SAR NG21
- Delivered: 1902
- First run: 1903
- Withdrawn: 1918

The Cape Government Railways NG 0-6-0T of 1903 was a South African steam locomotive from the pre-Union era in the Cape of Good Hope.

In 1902, Arthur Koppel, acting as agent, imported a single 0-6-0T narrow gauge tank steam locomotive for a customer in Durban. It was then purchased by the Cape Government Railways and used as construction locomotive on the Avontuur branch from 1903. In 1912, this locomotive was assimilated into the South African Railways and in 1917 it was sent to German South West Africa during the First World War campaign in that territory.

== Manufacturer ==
A single locomotive, built by Krauss & Company in 1902, was imported in 1902 by Arthur Koppel, acting as agent. It was purchased by the Cape Government Railways (CGR) and placed in service from 1903 as construction locomotive on the narrow gauge Avontuur branch out of Port Elizabeth, where it was colloquially known as the Koppel engine.

The locomotive was a Krauss type XXVIIab with works number 4830, which was unique in South Africa. It appears to be identical to half a Zwillinge, the twin Feldbahn locomotives built by the same firm and others for the Swakopmund-Windhuk Staatsbahn in German South West Africa, except that the cab was enclosed at the rear. The engine had outside Stephenson valve gear and was a coal burner, fitted with a balloon chimney to accommodate a spark arrester.

== Service ==
=== Cape Government Railways ===
The photograph shows the locomotive hauling a makeshift water tender, consisting of two water tanks on a two-axle goods wagon, with a water pipe strung along the locomotive's side to feed water into the side tanks on the engine. After completion of the Avontuur line, the locomotive was retained in service since it could haul three passenger coaches more economically than a petrol railcar.

=== South African Railways ===
When the Union of South Africa was established on 31 May 1910, the three Colonial government railways (CGR, Natal Government Railways and Central South African Railways) were united under a single administration to control and administer the railways, ports and harbours of the Union. Although the South African Railways and Harbours came into existence in 1910, the actual classification and renumbering of all the rolling stock of the three constituent railways were only implemented with effect from 1 January 1912.

When it came onto the roster of the South African Railways (SAR) in 1912, the locomotive was numbered NG21, with the letters NG identifying it as a narrow gauge locomotive in the SAR registers.

=== First World War ===
In 1915, shortly after the outbreak of the First World War, the German South West Africa colony was occupied by the Union Defence Forces. Since a large part of the territory's railway infrastructure was destroyed or damaged by retreating German forces, an urgent need arose for locomotives for use on the narrow gauge lines in that territory. In 1917, no. NG21 was transferred to the Defence Department for service in South West Africa. It did not return to South Africa after the war and was withdrawn from service in 1918.
