= 1910 in South Africa =

- Decades: 1890s; 1900s; 1910s; 1920s; 1930s
- See also: List of years in South Africa

The following lists events that happened during 1910 in South Africa.

== Incumbents ==
=== Cape Colony ===
- Governor of the Cape of Good Hope: Maj Gen Henry Scobell (acting) (until 30 May).
- Prime Minister of the Cape of Good Hope: John X. Merriman (until 30 May).

=== Natal ===
- Governor of the Colony of Natal: The Lord Methuen (until 30 May).
- Prime Minister of the Colony of Natal: Frederick Robert Moor (until 28 April).

=== Orange River Colony ===
- Governor of the Orange River Colony: Sir Hamilton Goold-Adams (until 30 May).
- Prime Minister of the Orange River Colony: Abraham Fischer (until 30 May).

=== Transvaal ===
- Governor of the Transvaal Colony and High Commissioner for Southern Africa: The Earl of Selborne (until 30 May).
- Prime Minister of the Transvaal Colony: Louis Botha (until 30 May).

=== Union of South Africa ===
- Monarch: King George V (starting 31 May).
- Governor-General of the Union of South Africa and High Commissioner for Southern Africa: The Viscount Gladstone (from 31 May).
- Prime Minister of the Union of South Africa: Louis Botha (from 31 May).
- Chief Justice: John de Villiers, 1st Baron de Villiers.

== Events ==
March

- 10 – Nazareth Baptist Church, an African-initiated church, is founded by Prophet Isaiah Shembe.

May

- 31 – The Union of South Africa is established from the former British colonies of the Cape of Good Hope, Natal, Transvaal and Orange River Colony.
- 31 – Herbert John Gladstone becomes the first Governor-General of the Union of South Africa.
- 31 – Louis Botha becomes the first Prime Minister of the Union of South Africa.

September

- 15 – The 1910 South African general election is held to determine the first members of the House of Assembly, the Parliament of the Union of South Africa. Per Thula Simpson, the South African Party wins 67 seats, the Unionist Party wins 39, the Labour Party wins four, and independent candidates win 11. The major upset of the election involves Louis Botha's defeat at the hands of Percy FitzPatrick in the Pretoria East constituency. Botha has to accept a seat in the Losberg district in order to retain his role as Prime Minister of South Africa.
- 17 – King George V granted an official coat of arms to the Union.

November

- 4 – The 1st South African Parliament opens.

December

- 28 – Official flag badges approved for the Union.

Unknown date

- The Girl Guides movement is established.
- The white population in South Africa is 21.5% of the total.
- Witwatersrand gold mine owners come under pressure to improve sanitary conditions since a third of the black miners are dying of pneumonia.
- The Pretoria and Johannesburg branches of the Transvaal University College (TUC) split into independent institutions. The branches will later become the University of Pretoria (Tuks) and the University of the Witwatersrand (Wits) respectively.

== Births ==
- 24 March – Adolph Malan, World War II fighter pilot. (d. 1963)
- 9 July – Govan Mbeki, anti-apartheid activist and politician. (d. 2001)
- 15 July – Bettie du Toit, trade unionist and anti-apartheid activist (d. 2002)
- 30 September – Monty Naicker, medical doctor and politician. (d. 1978)
- 26 November – Cyril Cusack, South African–born actor (d. 1993)

== Deaths ==
- 18 July – Johan Zulch de Villiers, attorney and mayor of Johannesburg. (b. 1845)

== Railways ==
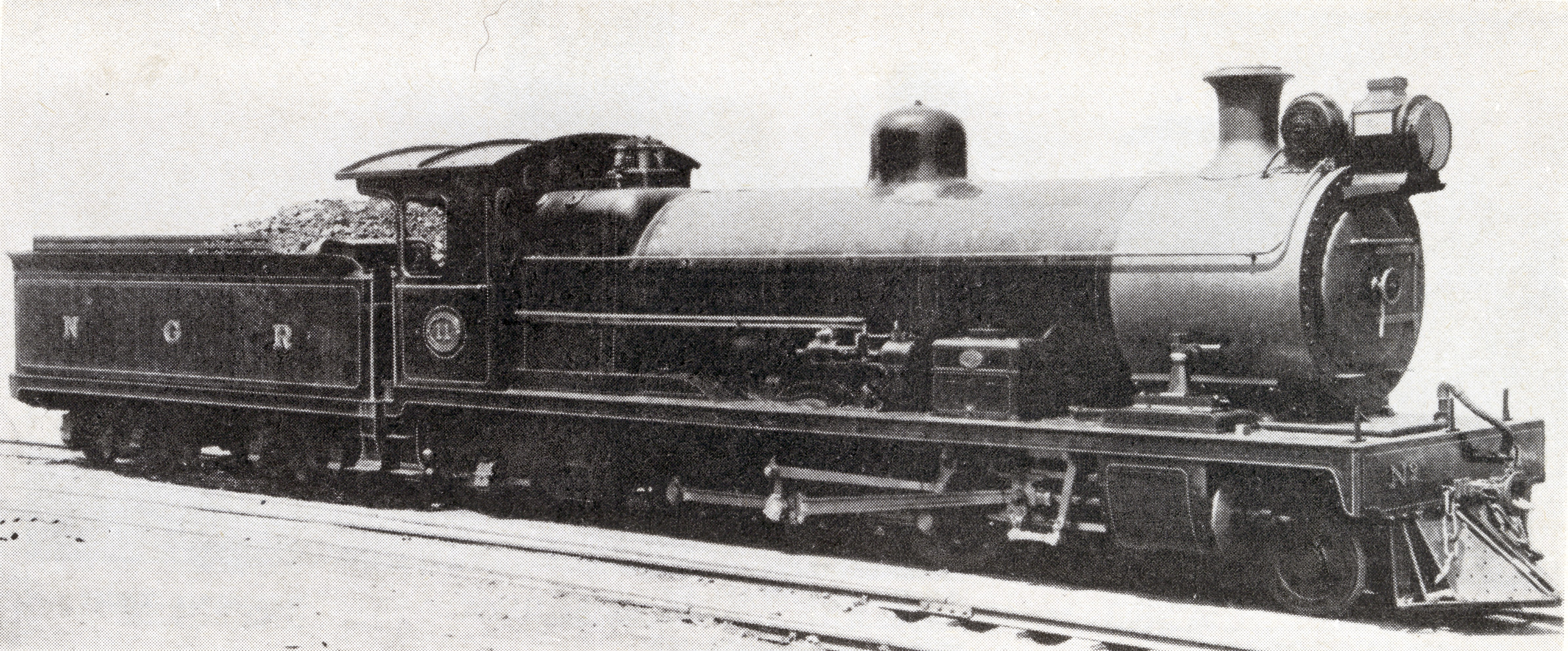
NGR Class A

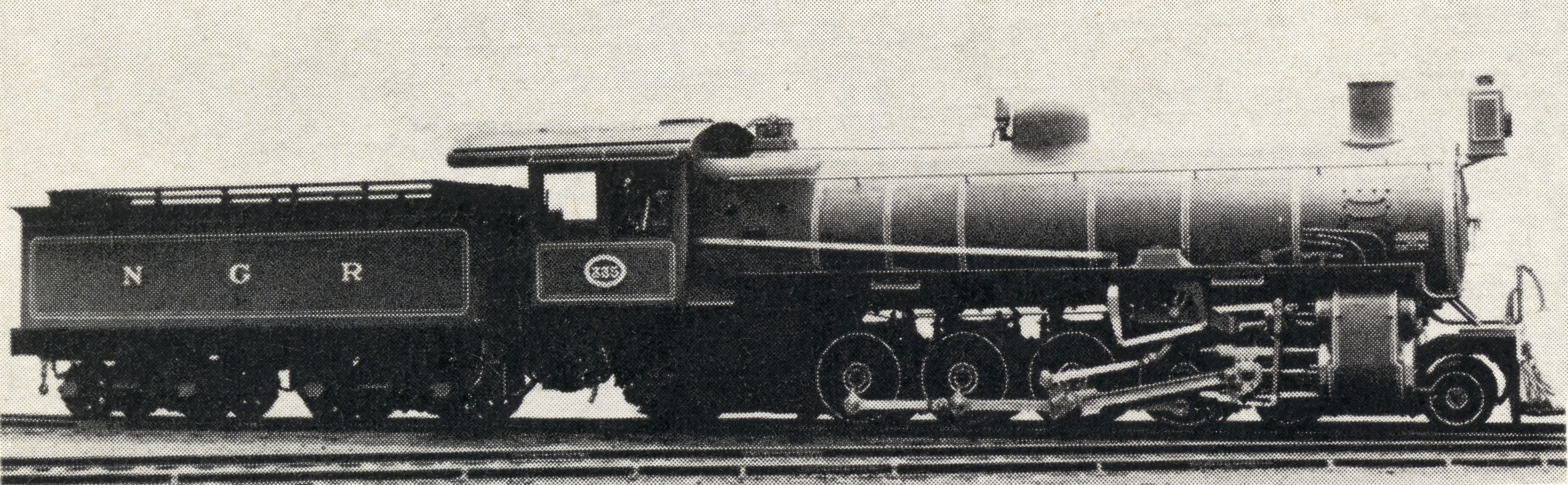
NGR Maud Allan

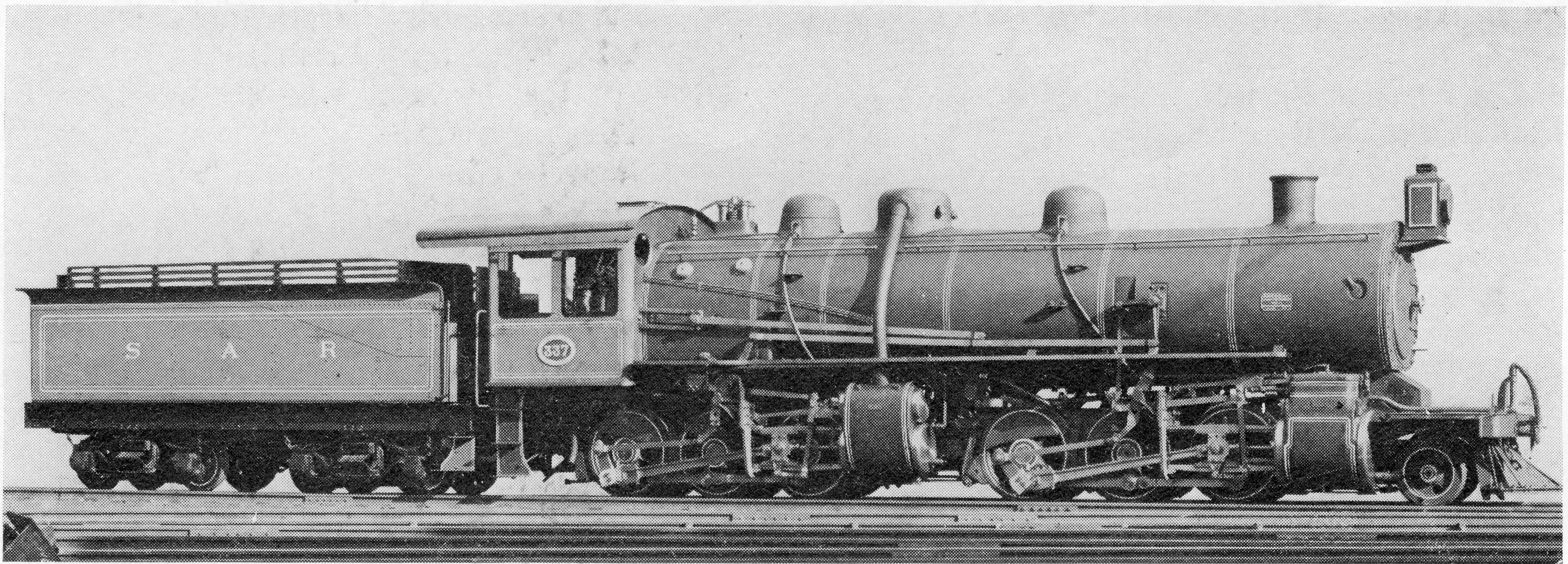
SAR Class MB

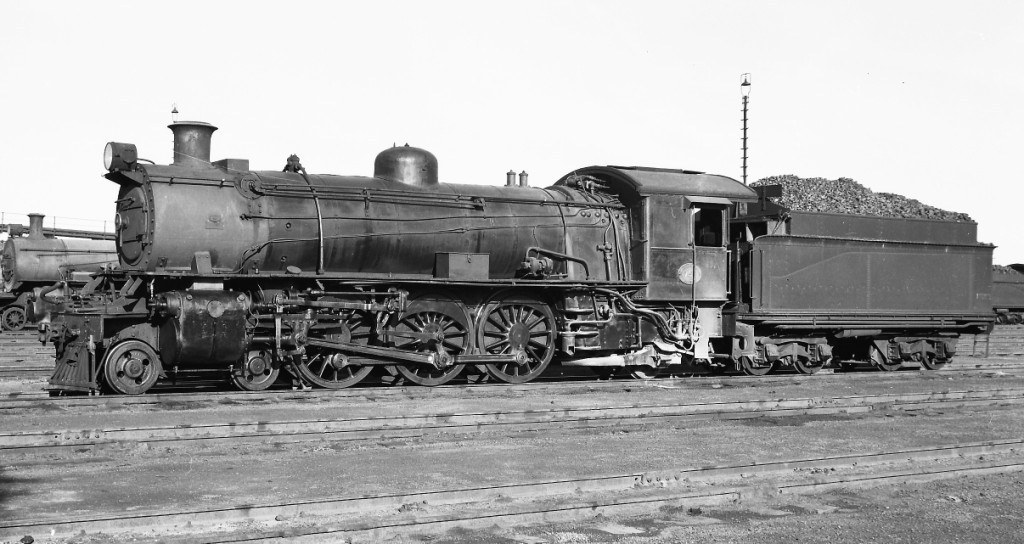
CSAR Class 10-1

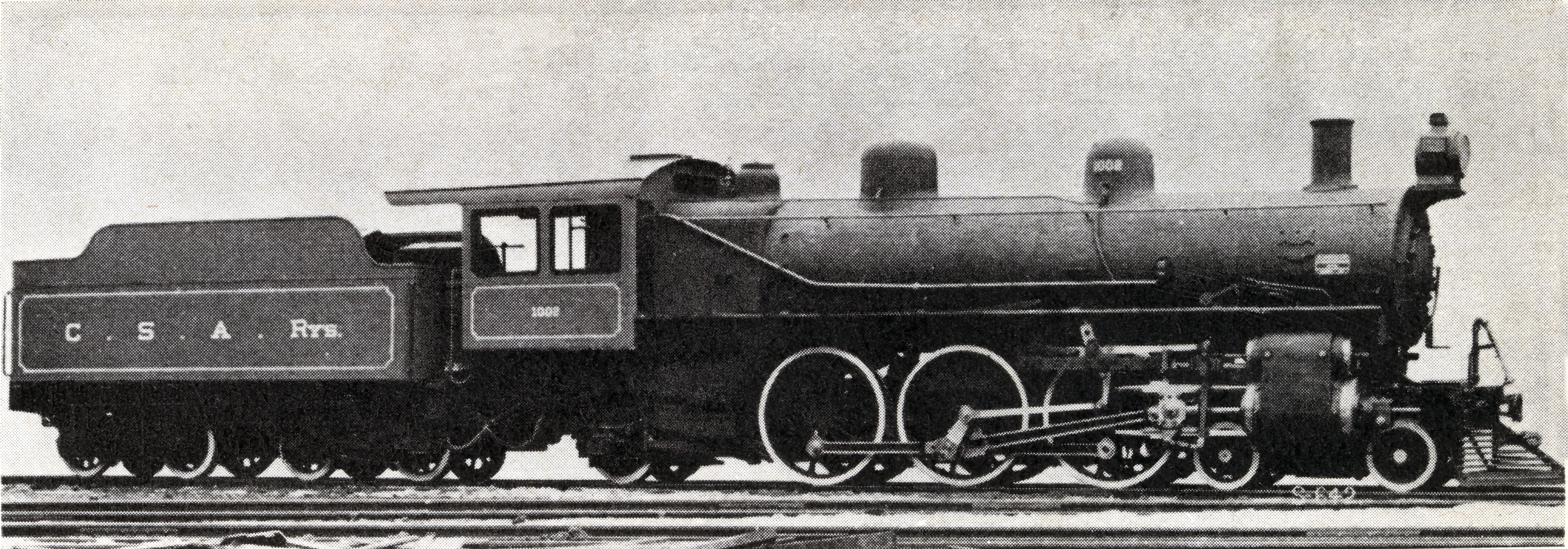
SAR Class 10D

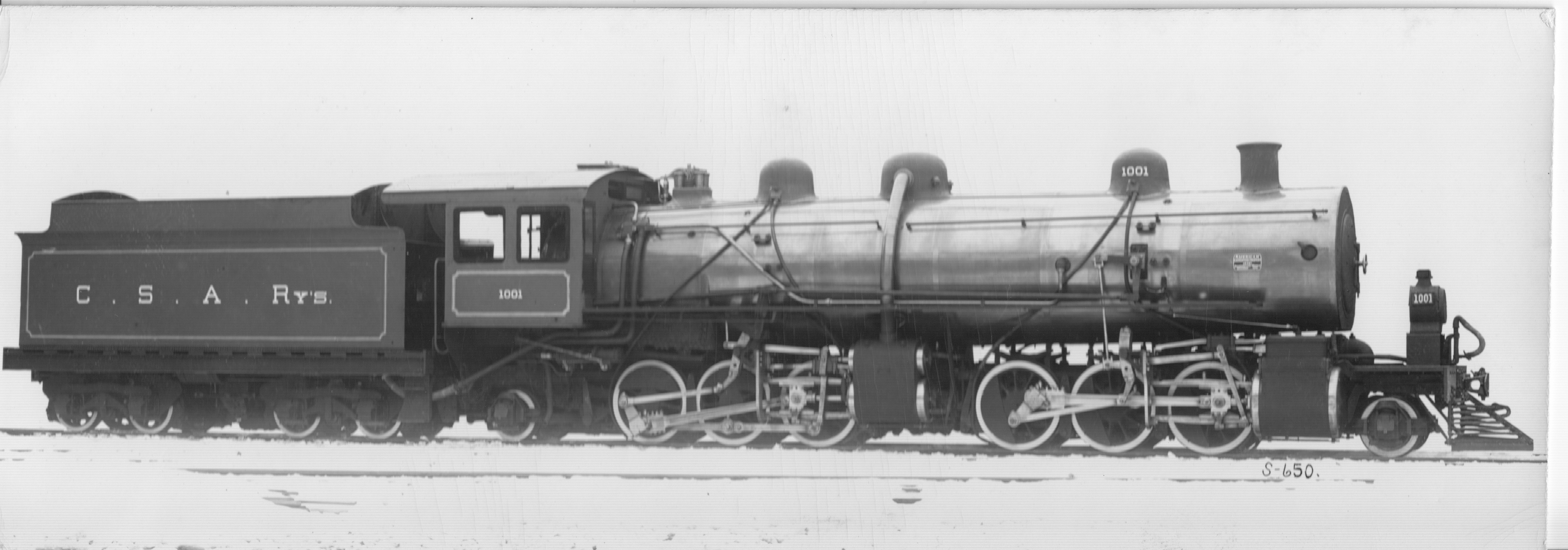
SAR Class MD

=== Railway lines opened ===
- 21 March – Cape Eastern – Riverside (Natal) to Malenge, 8 miles 24 chains (13.4 kilometres).
- 27 April – Natal – Utrecht Junction to Utrecht, 26 miles (41.8 kilometres).
- 29 April – Transvaal – Belfast to Lydenburg, 64 miles 40 chains (103.8 kilometres).
- 15 May – Transvaal – Komatipoort to Newington, 68 miles 25 chains (109.9 kilometres).
- 4 July – Transvaal – Dunswart to Cranbourne, 3 miles 14 chains (5.1 kilometres).

=== Locomotives ===
Natal

- Four new Cape gauge locomotive types enter service on the Natal Government Railways (NGR):
  - Two Class A 4-6-2 Pacific type locomotives, built in their Durban workshops. In 1912, these locomotives will be designated Class 2C on the South African Railways (SAR).
  - A single Class B 4-8-2 Mountain type locomotive, also known as the America D and nicknamed "Maud Allan" by the enginemen. In 1912, it will be designated Class 3A on the SAR.
  - Twenty-one Class B 4-8-0 Mastodon type tender locomotives. In 1912, they will be designated Class 1A on the SAR.
  - Five 2-6-6-0 Mallet articulated compound steam locomotives. In 1912, they will be designated Class MB on the SAR.

Transvaal

- Five new Cape gauge locomotive types enter service on the Central South African Railways (CSAR):
  - In March, ten Class 10-2 4-6-2 Pacific type steam locomotives, five with and five without superheaters. In 1912, they will be designated Class 10A (saturated steam) and Class 10B (superheated) on the SAR.
  - Twelve lighter Class 10-C 4-6-2 Pacific type locomotives. In 1912, they will be designated Class 10C on the SAR.
  - One American-built Class 10 4-6-2 Pacific type. In 1912, it will be designated the sole Class 10D on the SAR.
  - Also in March, a single experimental 2-6-6-2 Mallet articulated locomotive. In 1912, it will be designated Class MD on the SAR.
