= 1909 in South Africa =

- Decades: 1880s; 1890s; 1900s; 1910s; 1920s
- See also: List of years in South Africa

The following lists events that happened during 1909 in South Africa.

== Incumbents ==
- Governor of the Cape of Good Hope and High Commissioner for Southern Africa:Walter Hely-Hutchinson.
- Governor of the Colony of Natal: Matthew Nathan.
- Prime Minister of the Cape of Good Hope: Leander Starr Jameson.
- Prime Minister of the Colony of Natal: Frederick Robert Moor.
- Prime Minister of the Orange River Colony: Hamilton John Goold-Adams.
- Prime Minister of the Transvaal Colony: Louis Botha.

== Events ==
February

- 25 – Mahatma Gandhi is arrested at Volksrust for failure to produce a registration certificate and is sentenced to 3 months imprisonment.

June

- 15 – Representatives from England, Australia and South Africa meet at Lord's Cricket Ground and form the Imperial Cricket Conference (ICC).
- Mahatma Gandhi embarks in Cape Town for Southampton, England.

November

- 30 – Mahatma Gandhi and the Transvaal Indian Deputation arrive back in Cape Town.

December

- 28 – The first manned heavier-than-air powered flight in South Africa is made by French aviator Albert Kimmerling by taking off from the Nahoon Racecourse at East London in a Voisin 1907 biplane.

Unknown date

- South Africa becomes the first non-European country to join FIFA.

== Births ==
- 19 March – Louis Hayward, South African-born actor. (d. 1985)
- 5 August – Oscar Mpetha, anti-apartheid activist. (d. 1994)
- 5 September – Yusuf Dadoo, doctor and politician. (d. 1983)
- 5 December – Bobbie Heine Miller, South African tennis player. (d. 2016)

== Deaths ==
- 13 April – Sir Donald Currie GCMG, shipping magnate and donor of the Currie Cups for rugby and cricket. (b. 1825)

== Railways ==
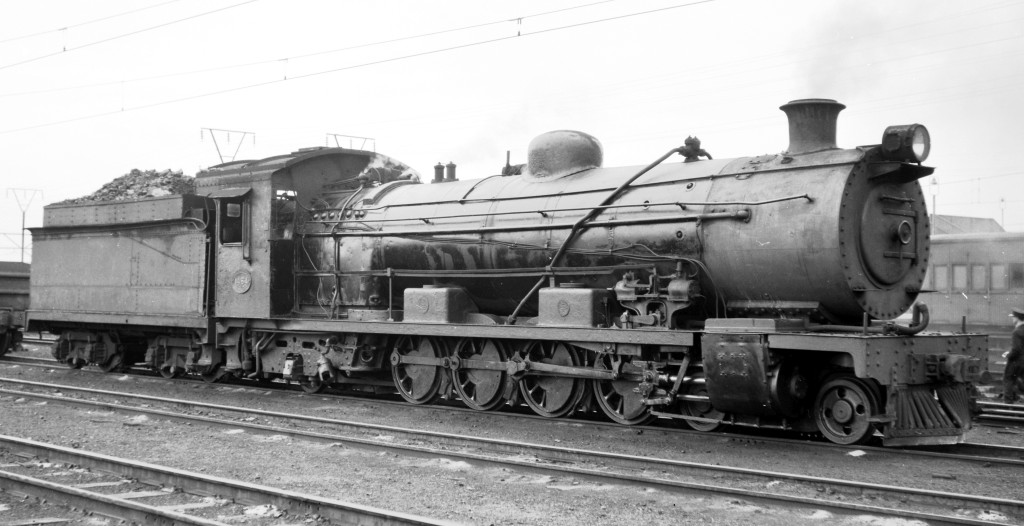
NGR Class B

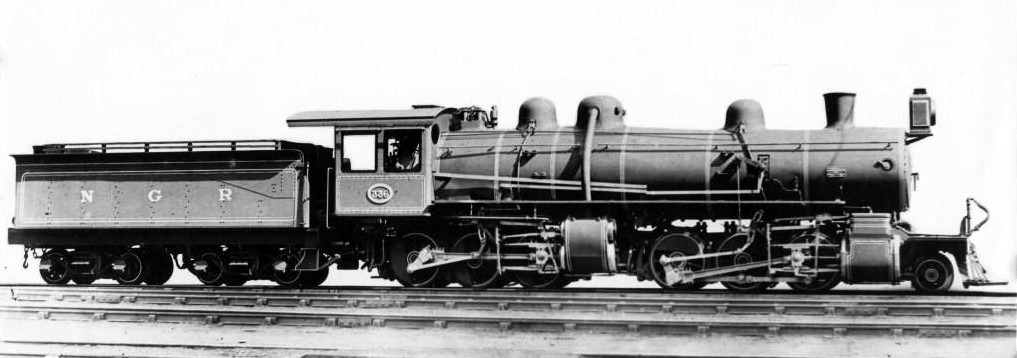
NGR Mallet

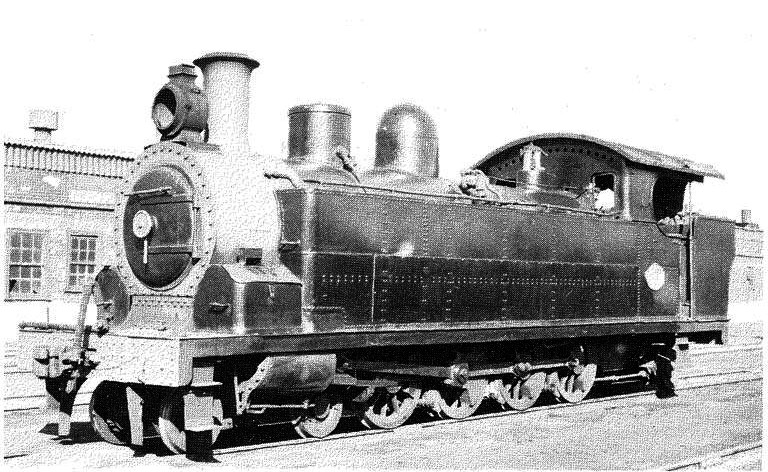
NGR Class C 4-8-2T

=== Railway lines opened ===
- 4 February – Natal – Creighton to Riverside (Cape), 12 miles 3 chains (19.4 kilometres).
- 1 April – Natal – Vryheid East to Hlobane, 17 miles (27.4 kilometres).
- 18 May – Cape Midland – Barkly Bridge to Alexandria, 54 miles 20 chains (87.3 kilometres).

=== Locomotives ===
- Two new Cape gauge locomotive types enter service on the Natal Government Railways (NGR):
  - The first five of thirty 4-8-2 tender locomotives, the world's first true Mountain type locomotive. In 1912 it will be designated Class B on the South African Railways (SAR).
  - A single 2-6-6-0 Mallet articulated compound steam locomotive, the first Mallet type to enter service in South Africa. In 1912 it will be designated Class MA on the SAR.
- The NGR begins to modify some of its Class C 4-10-2T Reid Tenwheeler locomotives to a 4-8-2T wheel arrangement to make them suitable for yard work without the risk of derailing as a result of the long ten-coupled wheelbase. In 1912 these will be designated Class H2 on the SAR.
