= 1908 in South Africa =

- Decades: 1880s; 1890s; 1900s; 1910s; 1920s
- See also: List of years in South Africa

The following lists events that happened during 1908 in South Africa.

== Incumbents ==
- Governor of the Cape of Good Hope and High Commissioner for Southern Africa:Walter Hely-Hutchinson.
- Governor of the Colony of Natal: Matthew Nathan.
- Prime Minister of the Cape of Good Hope: Leander Starr Jameson.
- Prime Minister of the Colony of Natal: Frederick Robert Moor.
- Prime Minister of the Orange River Colony: Hamilton John Goold-Adams.
- Prime Minister of the Transvaal Colony: Louis Botha.

== Events ==
January

- 30 – Mahatma Gandhi is released from prison by Jan Smuts after having been tried and sentenced to 2 months in prison earlier in the month.

March

- 4 – The Pretoria branch of the Transvaal University College, precursor to the University of Pretoria, is established.

October

- 7 – Mahatma Gandhi is arrested in Volksrust, along with fifteen other Indians, for entering Transvaal without registration certificates and is sentenced to two months imprisonment with hard labor.

November

- 16 – Devastating flooding in Port Elizabeth

Unknown date

- Bosman de Ravelli composes the first Afrikaans art song

== Births ==
- 5 March – Arthur Wegelin, composer.
- 23 April – Bram Fischer, lawyer and champion against apartheid, is born in the Orange River Colony. (d. 1975)
- 2 July – Andries Johannes Bester de Klerk, writer and secretary of the Cape Province, is born in Williston, Cape Colony
- 10 July – Wally Hayward, South African athlete (d. 2006)

== Railways ==
=== Railway lines opened ===
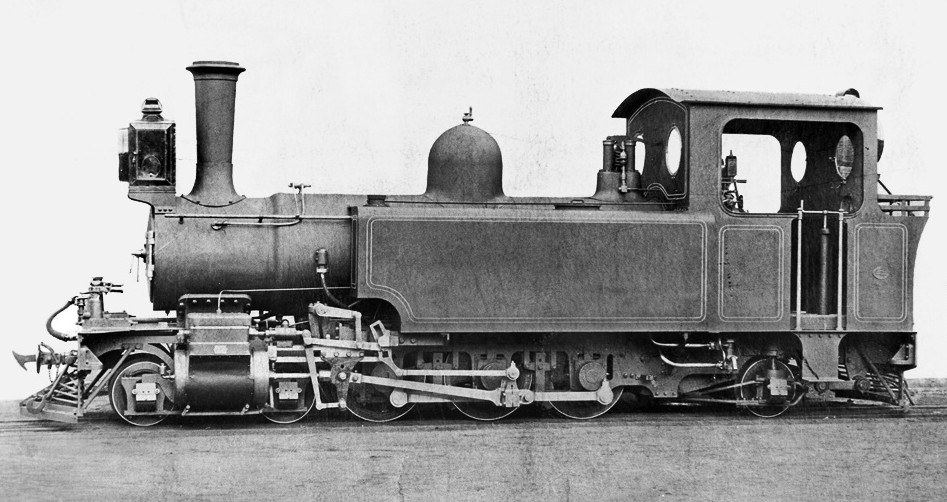
CGR NG 4-6-2T Pacific

- 4 January – Cape Eastern – West Bank, Buffalo Harbour to Chiselhurst, 4 miles 35 chains (7.1 kilometres).
- 6 February – Transvaal – Machadodorp to Breyten, 55 miles 3 chains (88.6 kilometres).
- 8 April – Free State – Hamilton to Beaconsfield (Cape), 99 miles 52 chains (160.4 kilometres).
- 28 May – Cape Western – Milnerton to Ascot, 2 miles (3.2 kilometres).
- 3 June – Natal – Esperanza to Donnybrook (Narrow gauge), 94 miles (151.3 kilometres).

=== Locomotives ===
- The Cape Government Railways places two 4-6-2 Pacific type narrow gauge tank steam locomotives in passenger service on the Walmer branch in Port Elizabeth.
