= 1600 Class =

1600 Class or Class 1600 may refer to:

- GWR 1600 Class, 0-6-0 steam locomotives
- Queensland Railways 1600 class, diesel locomotives
- NS Class 1600, electric locomotives
- SS 1600 class, 2-6-6-0 steam locomotives
