= 2660 =

2660 may refer to:

- 2-6-6-0, a Whyte notation classification of steam locomotive
- 2660 Wasserman, a minor planet
- 2660 BC
- 2660 AD/CE in the 27th century
