= South African Class MB 2-6-6-0 =

1910 articulated steam locomotive

NGR Mallet 2-6-6-0 1910 South African Class MB 2-6-6-0
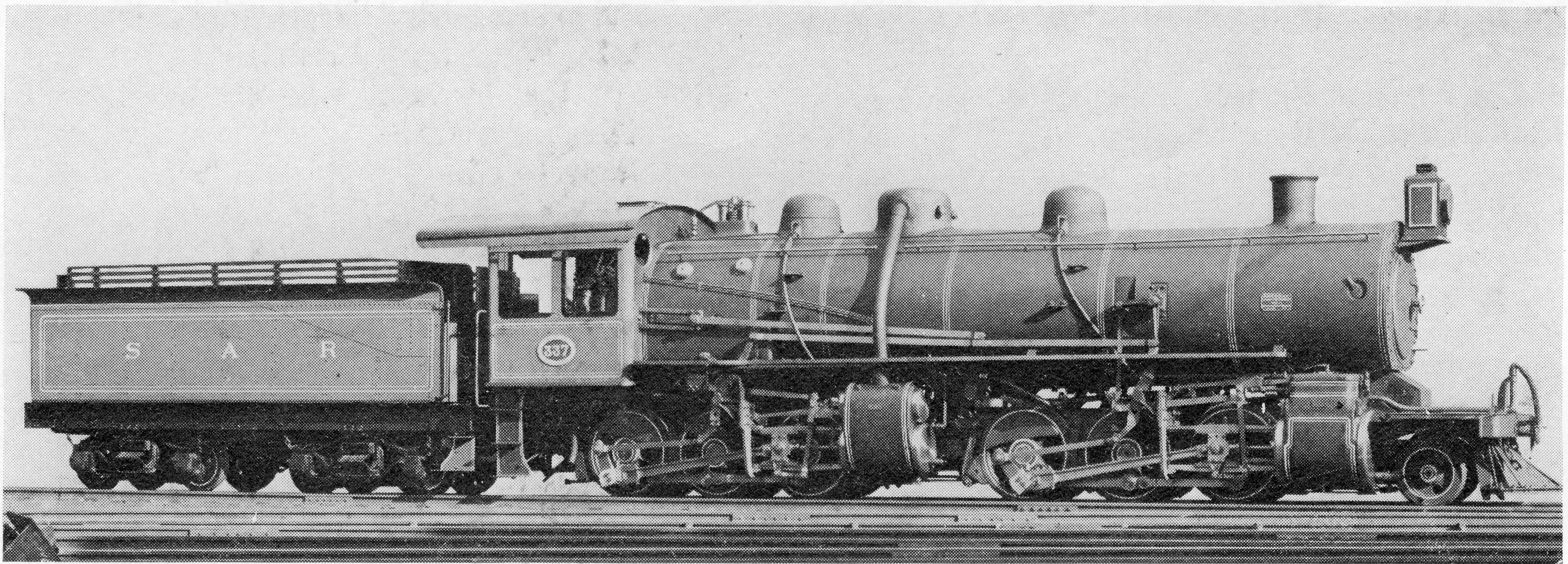
- NGR Mallet no. 337, SAR Class MB no. 1602, c. 1910
Type and origin
- Power type: Steam
- Designer: American Locomotive Company
- Builder: American Locomotive Company
- Serial number: 48337-48341
- Model: NGR Mallet
- Build date: 1910
- Total produced: 5
Specifications
- Configuration
  - Whyte: 2-6-6-0 (Denver)
  - UIC: (1'C)Cnv4
- Driver: 3rd & 6th coupled axles
- Gauge: 3 ft 6 in (1,067 mm) Cape gauge
- Leading dia.: 28 1/2 in (724 mm)
- Coupled dia.: 45 1/2 in (1,156 mm)
- Tender wheels: 30 in (762 mm)
- Wheelbase: 60 ft 9 1/4 in (18,523 mm)
  - Engine: 33 ft 2 in (10,109 mm)
  - Coupled: 8 ft 4 in (2,540 mm) per unit
  - Tender: 17 ft 10 in (5,436 mm)
  - Tender bogie: 5 ft 10 in (1,778 mm)
- Length
  - Over couplers: 69 ft 1 in (21,057 mm)
- Height: 12 ft 5 3/16 in (3,789 mm)
- Frame type: Bar
- Axle load: 16 LT 14 cwt (16,970 kg)
  - Leading: 7 LT 15 cwt (7,874 kg)
  - 1st coupled: 15 LT 5 cwt (15,490 kg)
  - 2nd coupled: 14 LT 10 cwt (14,730 kg)
  - 3rd coupled: 12 LT 9 cwt (12,650 kg)
  - 4th coupled: 11 LT 10 cwt (11,680 kg)
  - 5th coupled: 11 LT 16 cwt (11,990 kg)
  - 6th coupled: 16 LT 14 cwt (16,970 kg)
  - Tender axle: 11 LT 5 cwt (11,430 kg) average
- Adhesive weight: 82 LT 4 cwt (83,520 kg)
- Loco weight: 89 LT 19 cwt (91,390 kg)
- Tender weight: 45 LT (45,720 kg)
- Total weight: 134 LT 19 cwt (137,100 kg)
- Tender type: 2-axle bogies
- Fuel type: Coal
- Fuel capacity: 10 LT (10.2 t)
- Water cap.: 4,000 imp gal (18,200 L)
- Firebox
  - Type: Round-top
  - Grate area: 42.5 sq ft (3.95 m^{2})
- Boiler
  - Pitch: 7 ft 6 in (2,286 mm)
  - Diameter: 5 ft 8 in (1,727 mm)
  - Tube plates: 16 ft 7 1/2 in (5,067 mm)
  - Small tubes: 260: 2 1/4 in (57 mm)
- Boiler pressure: 200 psi (1,379 kPa)
- Safety valve: Ramsbottom
- Heating surface
  - Firebox: 154.6 sq ft (14.36 m^{2})
  - Tubes: 2,546.2 sq ft (236.55 m^{2})
  - Total surface: 2,700.8 sq ft (250.91 m^{2})
- Cylinders: Four
- High-pressure cylinder: 17 1/2 in (444 mm) bore 26 in (660 mm) stroke
- Low-pressure cylinder: 28 in (711 mm) bore 26 in (660 mm) stroke
- Valve gear: Walschaerts
- Couplers: Johnston link-and-pin
Performance figures
- Tractive effort: 44,810 lbf (199 kN) @ 50%
Career
- Operators: Natal Government Railways; South African Railways
- Class: NGR Mallet; SAR Class MB
- Number in class: 5
- Numbers: NGR 337-341; SAR 1602-1606
- Delivered: 1910
- First run: 1910
- Withdrawn: 1924

The South African Railways Class MB 2-6-6-0 of 1910 was a articulated steam locomotive from the pre-Union era in the Colony of Natal.

In November 1910, the Natal Government Railways placed five 2-6-6-0 Mallet articulated compound steam locomotives in service. In 1912, when they were assimilated into the South African Railways, they were renumbered and designated Class MB.

== Manufacturer ==
Following on the satisfactory performance of the experimental Mallet compound steam locomotive which had been acquired by the Natal Government Railways (NGR) in 1909, a further five similar locomotives were ordered from the American Locomotive Company (ALCO) in 1910. They were delivered in November of that year and numbered in the range from 337 to 341.

== Characteristics ==
Like the previous Mallet locomotive, these five had Walschaerts valve gear, bar frames and used saturated steam. They differed little from the previous Mallet, basically only in respect of their larger boilers which made them slightly heavier and their tenders with a 1 long ton 10 hundredweight (1.5 tonnes) larger coal capacity.

In a compound locomotive, steam is expanded in phases. After being expanded in a high-pressure cylinder and having then lost pressure and given up part of its heat, it is exhausted into a larger-volume low-pressure cylinder for secondary expansion, after which it is exhausted through the smokebox.

In the compound Mallet locomotive, the rear set of coupled wheels are driven by the smaller high-pressure cylinders which are fed steam from the steam dome. Their spent steam is then fed to the larger low-pressure cylinders which drive the front set of coupled wheels. By comparison, in the more usual arrangement of simple expansion, steam is expanded just once in any one cylinder before being exhausted through the smokebox.

== Service ==
These five locomotives joined the first Mallet in banking service, working heavy coal trains between Estcourt and Highlands on the Natal mainline. To relieve coupler strain, they were used in three-locomotive trains and, in this manner, were able to haul 750 long tons (762 tonnes) up the one in thirty (3⅓%) gradients on that line.

== South African Railways ==
Railway network of the Natal Government Railways in 1910 upon the establishment of the Union of South Africa and the South African Railways

When the Union of South Africa was established on 31 May 1910, the three Colonial government railways (Cape Government Railways, NGR and Central South African Railways) were united under a single administration to control and administer the railways, ports and harbours of the Union.

Although the South African Railways and Harbours came into existence in 1910, with Sir William Hoy appointed as its first General Manager, the actual classification and renumbering of all the rolling stock of the three constituent railways were only implemented with effect from 1 January 1912.

In 1912, these five locomotives were renumbered in the range from 1602 to 1606 and designated Class MB on the South African Railways. They had a relatively short service life and were withdrawn from service by 1924. Their early demise was probably brought forward considerably by the appearance of the Garratt locomotive type on Cape Gauge in 1921.
