= SS 1600 class =

Class of 30 Indonesian 2-6-6-0 locomotives

SS 1600 class Indonesian State Railways CC50 class
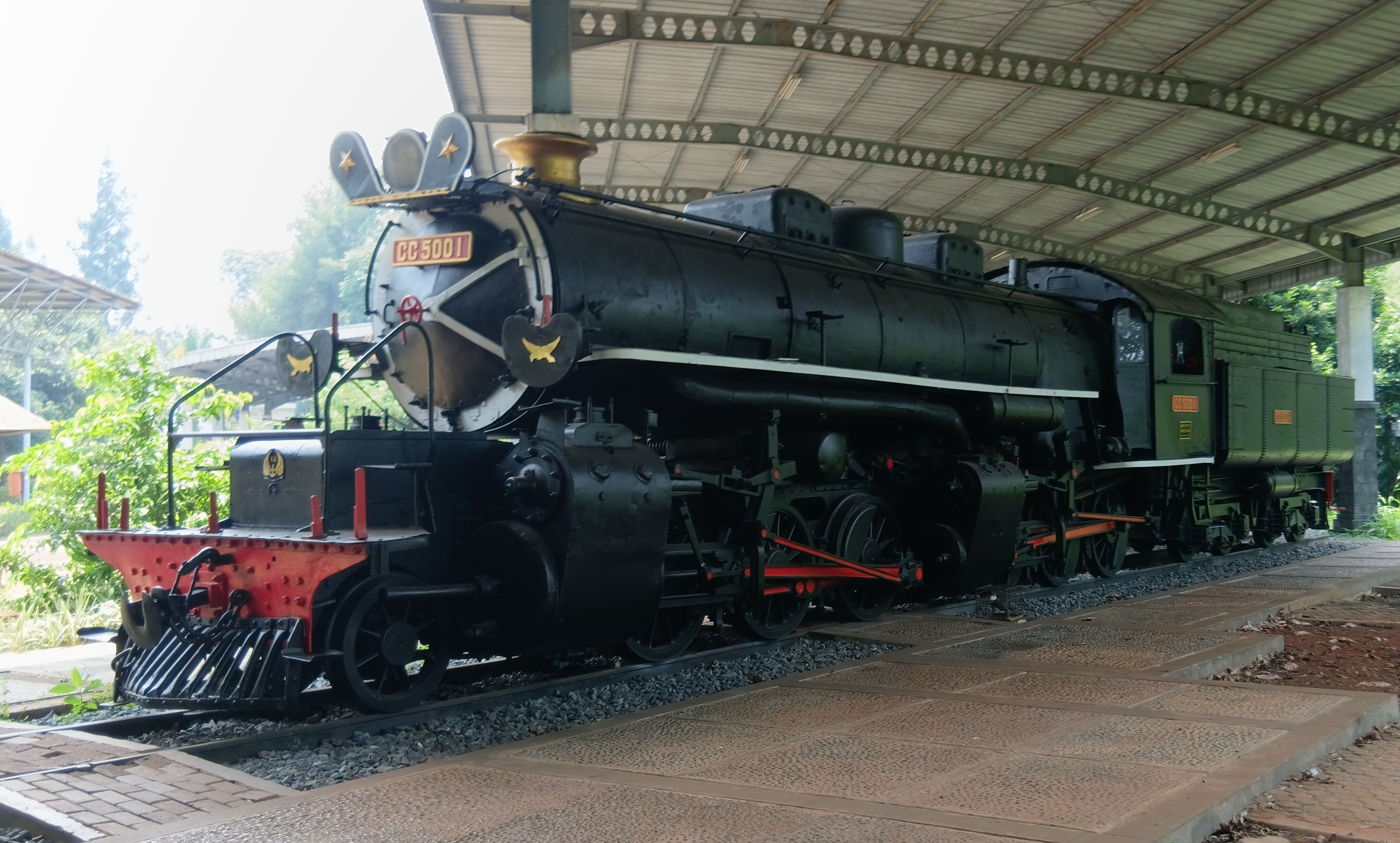
- CC50 01 at the Transportation Museum of Taman Mini Indonesia Indah
Type and origin
- Power type: Steam
- Builder: Werkspoor, Netherlands; Swiss Locomotive and Machine Works, Switzerland
- Serial number: 558–565, 570–575 (Werkspoor); 3211–3220, 3249–3254 (SLM)
- Model: Mallet articulated
- Build date: 1927–1928
- Total produced: 30
Specifications
- Configuration
  - Whyte: 2-6-6-0
  - AAR: 1-C-C
  - UIC: (1C')C'
- Gauge: 1,067 mm (3 ft 6 in)
- Wheel diameter: 1,106 mm (3 ft 7.5 in)
- Length: 19.9 m (65 ft)
- Width: 2.45 m (8 ft 0 in)
- Height: 3.68 m (12 ft 1 in)
- Empty weight: 65.7 t (72.4 short tons)
- Tender weight: 39.5 t (43.5 short tons)
- Fuel type: Coal, teak wood, and residual oil
- Water cap.: 25,000 L (6,600 US gal; 5,500 imp gal)
- Electric system/s: Maffei Poge (Originally fitted); Pyle National (DKA-era modification)
- Cylinder size: 420 mm and 650 mm × 620 mm (17 in and 26 in × 24 in)
- Train brakes: Vacuum brakes Manual brakes Riggenbach Brakes
Performance figures
- Maximum speed: 55 km/h (34 mph)
- Power output: 1,200 hp (890 kW)
Career
- Operators: Staatsspoorwegen; Indonesian State Railways
- Numbers: 1601–1630 later CC50 01–CC50 30
- Nicknames: Sri Gunung / De Bergkoningin; Si Gombar
- Locale: Java
- First run: 1927
- Withdrawn: 1984
- Preserved: CC50 01, CC50 22, CC50 29

The SS 1600 class, later reclassified as the CC50 class, is a 2-6-6-0 articulated Mallet type steam locomotive previously operated by the Staatsspoorwegen (SS), the state-owned railway of Dutch East Indies. It was later inherited by the Indonesian State Railway. The class was built by Werkspoor and the Swiss Locomotive and Machine Works (SLM).

== Background ==
The Staatsspoorwegen had previously operated various Mallet locomotives to operate in the mountainous rail lines, such as the 0-4-4-2T SS 500 class (DKA BB10) and 2-6-6-0T SS 520 class (DKA CC10) tank engines and the various 2-8-8-0 tender engines. With the increasing traffic, the railway found out that they needed to double head the Mallet tank engines to pull heavier trains, while the 2-8-8-0s engines has a high axle load which makes them unsuitable for some railway lines. Thus, SS needed a more powerful locomotive with an axle load less than 11 t (10.8 long tons; 12.1 short tons).

To address the issue, the Technical Bureau of the Departement van Kolonien ordered the Swiss Locomotive and Machine Works (SLM) to design a high-power locomotive with maximum axle load of 11 tonnes, and with Staatsspoorwegen's standardized components to ensure spare parts compatibility with the rest of the locomotive fleet. This resulted in a 2-6-6-0 Mallet compound engine design with 4-cylinders.

== Operational history ==
The Staatsspoorwegen ordered a total of 30 1600 class Mallets from two manufacturers, consisting of 16 units from SLM and 14 units from Werkspoor, which was built in 1927–1928. The class were among the last locomotives to be ordered by the Staatsspoorwegen before the Great Depression of the 1930s.

The SS 1600 class was initially used to haul passengers and freight trains in the Priangan region of West Java. Later, they were also assigned to heavy freight trains duties on the Cikampek–Cirebon line in the northern plains of West Java and the Kertosono–Surabaya line in East Java. Starting in 1929, the class was also used to pull the Eendaagsche Express and later in 1936, also the Nacht Express trains on the mountainous Prupuk–Purwokerto section. The 1600s distinguished themselves by pulling 1,300 t (1,279 long tons; 1,433 short tons) trains at 55 km/h (34 mph), as well as easily navigating tight curves.

During the Japanese occupation of the Dutch East Indies, the 1600 class were reclassified as the CC50 class. At the conclusion of the Indonesian National Revolution in 1949, the CC50 class was inherited by the Indonesian State Railway (DKA, later renamed as PNKA, and renamed again as PJKA). During this period, the class was spread across Java. By 1971, the class were allocated to the locomotive depots of Purwakarta, Cibatu, and Banjar in West Java, Purwokerto and Ambarawa in Central Java, and Madiun and Sidotopo (Surabaya) in East Java. A CC50 was also sent to South Sumatra in the 1970s.

Near the end of their service in late 1970s and early 1980s, most of the class were based at Cibatu and worked on the mountainous lines of Cibatu–Garut–Cikajang and Purwakarta–Padalarang in West Java.

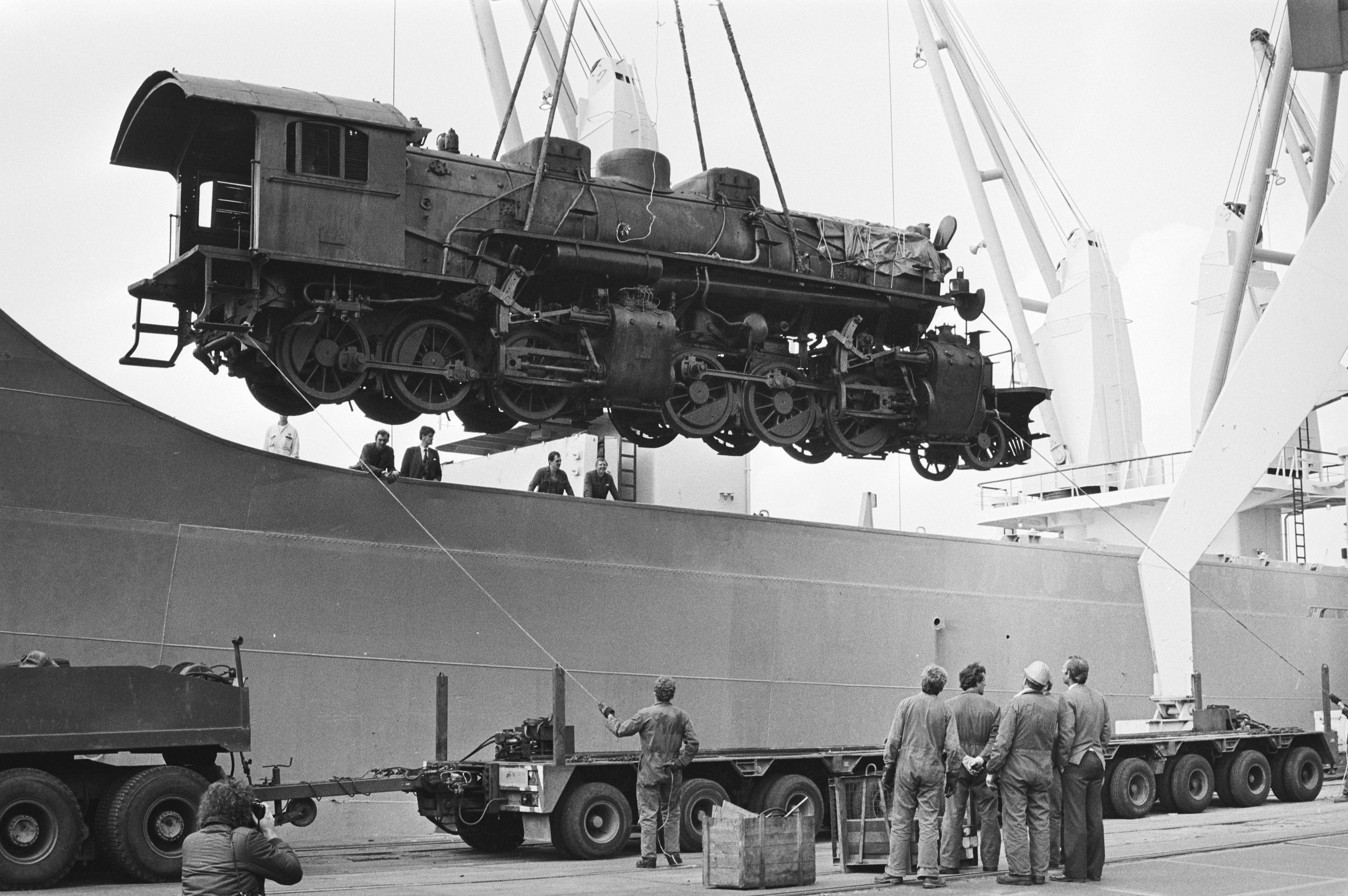
CC50 22 being unloaded at Rotterdam, 23 July 1981

In October 1979, the Utrecht Railway Museum in the Netherlands formally asked the Indonesian government and the Indonesian State Railway, by then called PJKA, to be granted a CC50 locomotive for display in the museum. The retired CC50 22 based at Purwokerto was chosen and then restored at Manggarai workshop. The CC50 22 was loaded aboard Nedlloyd Wissekerk at Tanjung Priok on 27 May 1981 for shipping and it arrived at Rotterdam on 23 July. The locomotive was formally donated by PJKA to the Utrecht Railway Museum on 5 October 1981, as a symbol of friendship between Indonesia and the Netherlands. Several years later, the locomotive was then returned to its original numbering, precisely as SS 1622.

The CC50 19 locomotive of Purwakarta depot starred in the Indonesian Independence War-themed film entitled Kereta Api Terakhir (The Last Train), which was released in 1981.

The impact of the policy of rationalizing steam locomotives to diesel locomotives meant that the CC50 had to retire in 1984 after the end of its service period was spent on the Cibatu–Garut route which began to close that same year. Its existence was displaced and replaced by various diesel locomotives.

== Preservation ==
Out of the 30 built, there are three preserved CC50 units, namely CC50 01, CC50 22, and CC50 29. CC50 01 is on display at the Transportation Museum in Taman Mini Indonesia Indah (TMII), Jakarta. Before being taken to TMII for preservation, this locomotive was given the components that were cannibalized from other CC50 units, for example the tender was taken from CC50 19. CC50 22 is preserved at the Utrecht Railway Museum, Netherlands. It was donated to the museum by the Indonesian government in 1981. CC50 29 is on display at the Ambarawa Railway Museum in Central Java. Additionally, a front part of CC50 locomotive, assembled from scrapped components, is located at the Cibatu locomotive depot in West Java.

SS no.	PJKA no.	Builder’s no.	Builder	Delivered	Image	Notes
1601	CC50 01	558	Werkspoor	1928		Tender from CC50 19
1622	CC50 22	573	Werkspoor	1928		
1629	CC50 29	3253	SLM	1928		

== Gallery ==
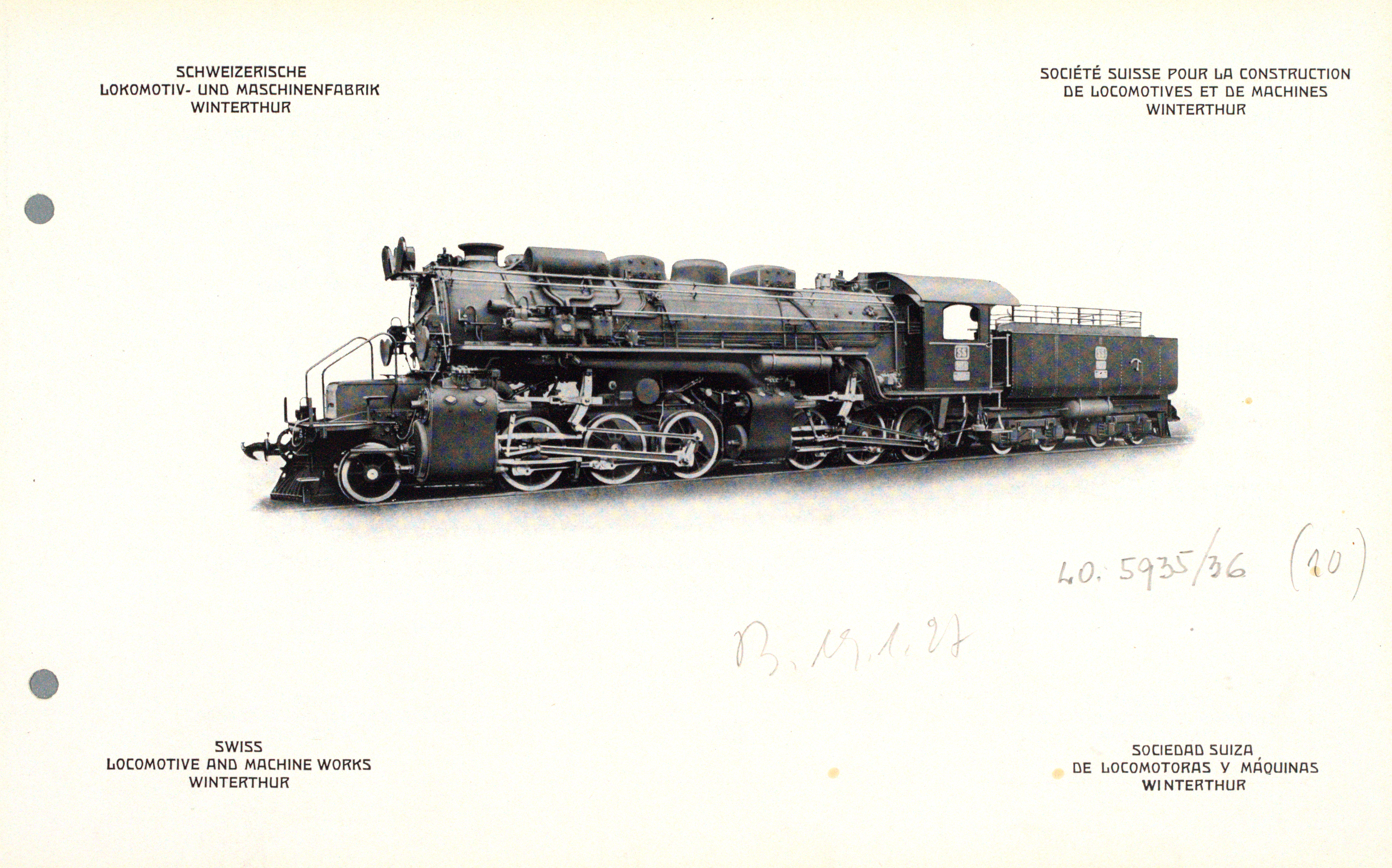
SLM builder photo of an SS 1600 class

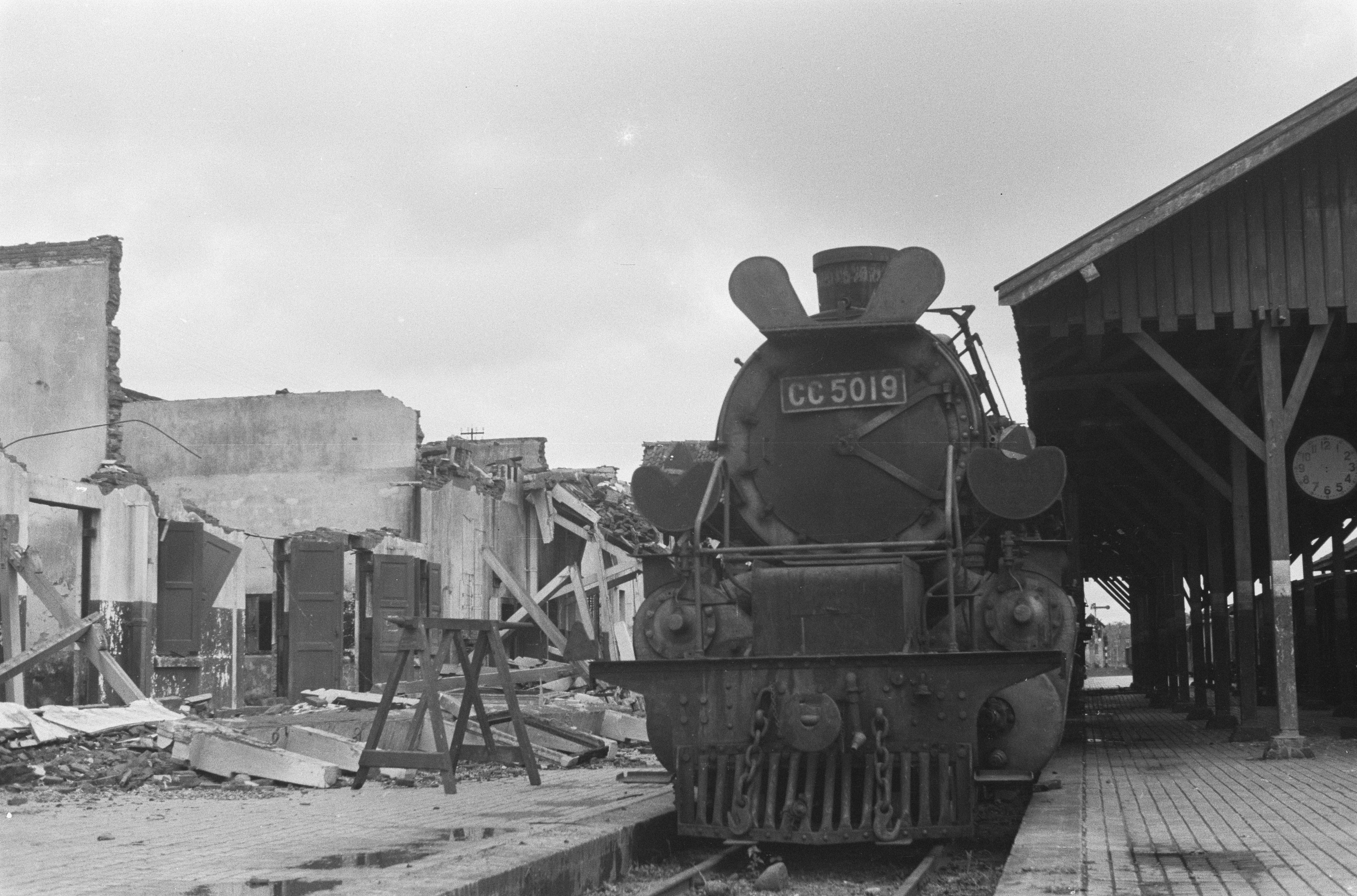
Abandoned CC50 19 at Kroya Station, with the destroyed station building in the background, October 1947

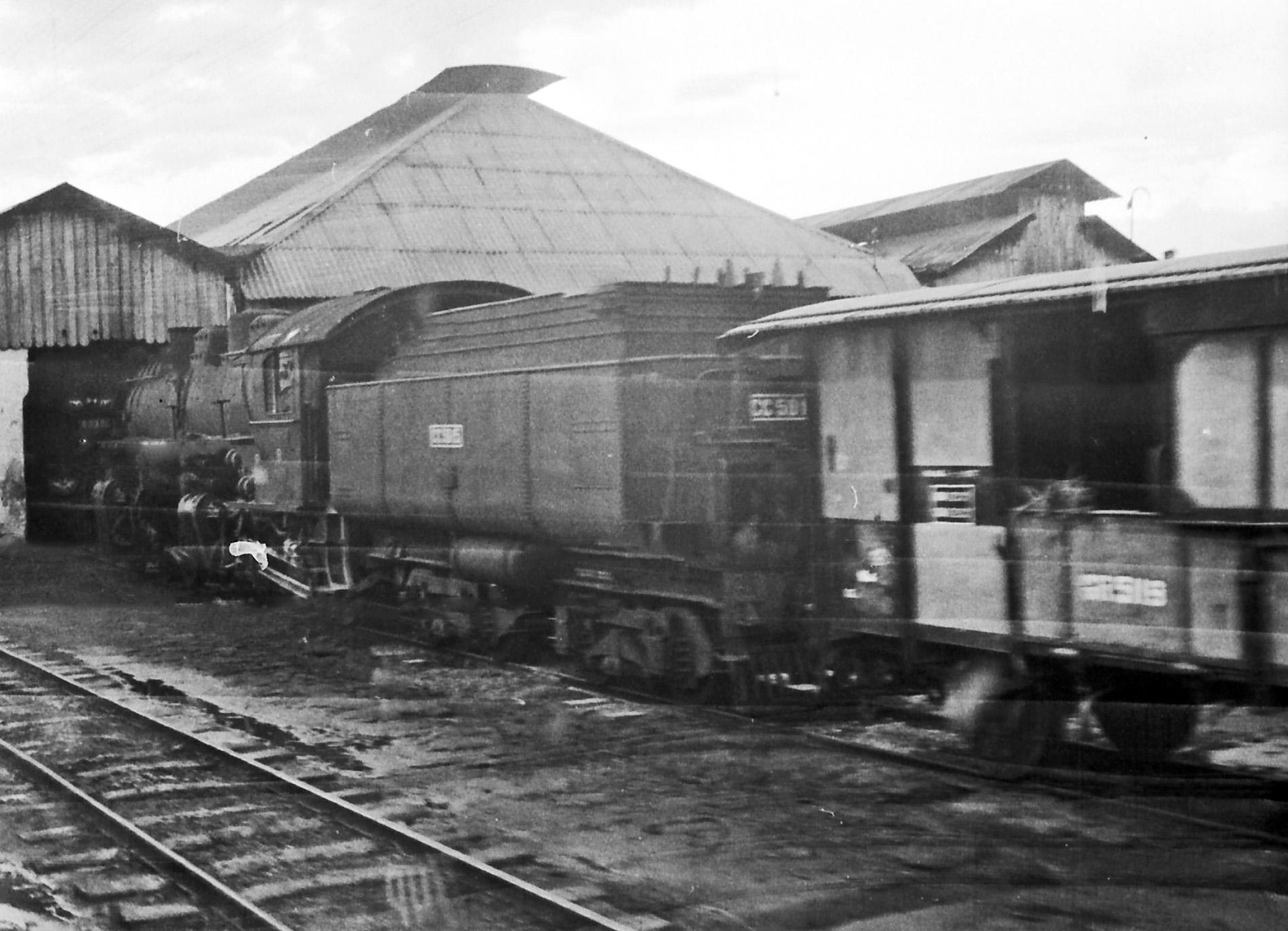
CC50 15 in Surabaya, 1971

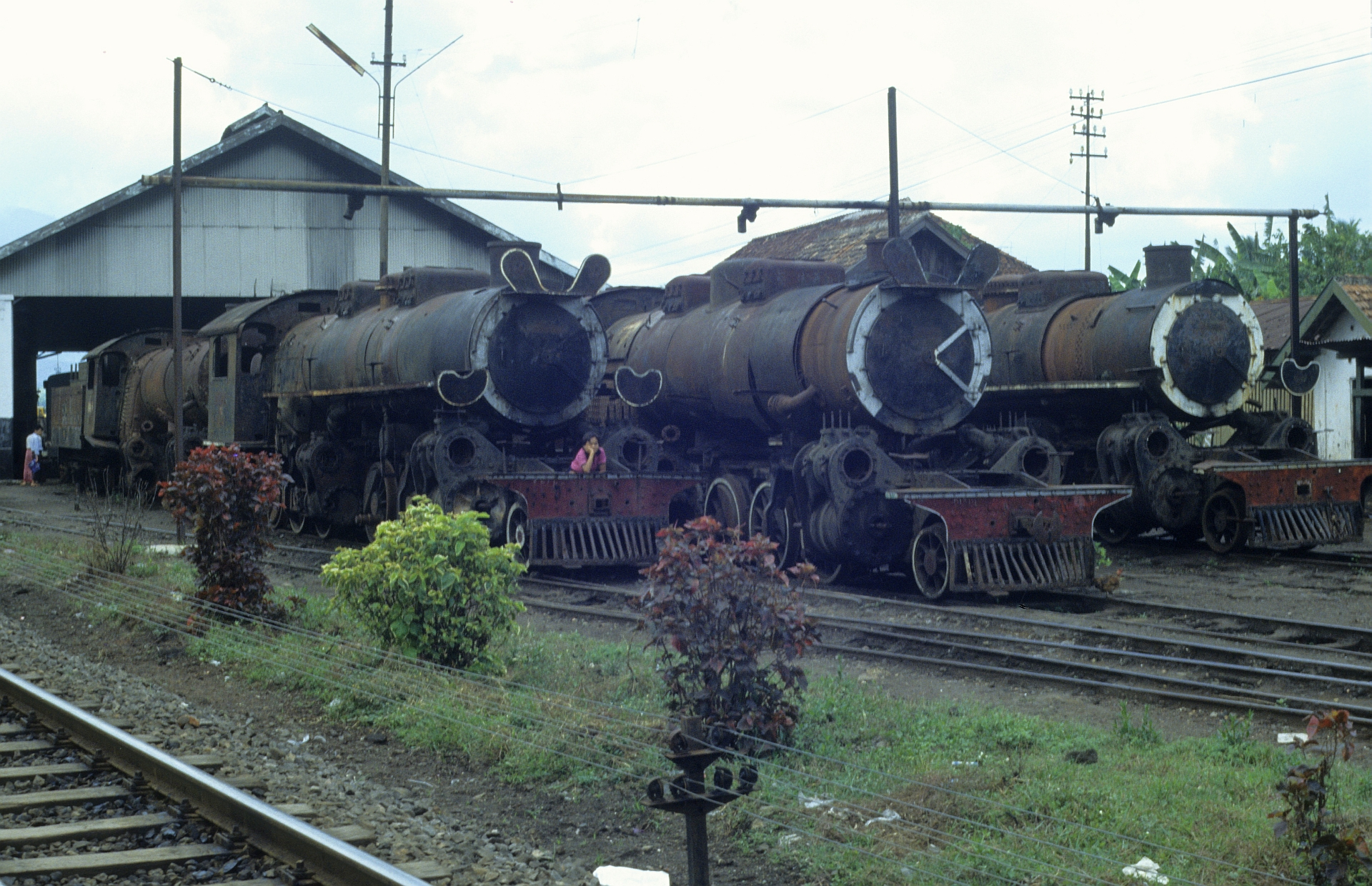
Derelict CC50s at Cibatu depot, December 1991

== See also ==
- SS 1000 class
- List of locomotives in Indonesia
