= South African Class 10D 4-6-2 =

1910 design of steam locomotive

CSAR Class 10 4-6-2 1910 South African Class 10D 4-6-2
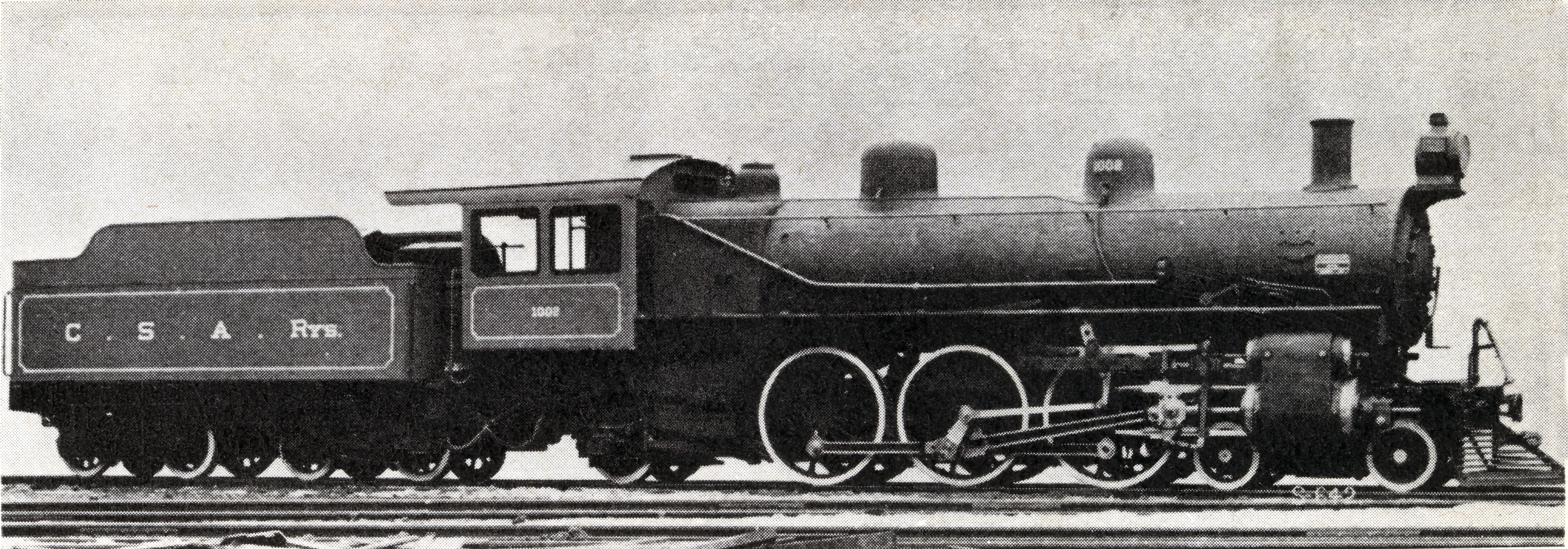
- CSAR no. 1002, SAR no. 779, c. 1910
Type and origin
- Power type: Steam
- Designer: Central South African Railways
- Builder: American Locomotive Company
- Serial number: 46715
- Model: CSAR Class 10
- Build date: 1910
- Total produced: 1
Specifications
- Configuration
  - Whyte: 4-6-2 (Pacific)
  - UIC: 2'C1'h2
- Driver: 2nd coupled axle
- Gauge: 3 ft 6 in (1,067 mm) Cape gauge
- Leading dia.: 28 1/2 in (724 mm)
- Coupled dia.: 62 in (1,575 mm)
- Trailing dia.: 33 in (838 mm)
- Tender wheels: 33 1/2 in (851 mm)
- Wheelbase: 55 ft (16,764 mm)
  - Engine: 29 ft 8 in (9,042 mm)
  - Leading: 6 ft (1,829 mm)
  - Coupled: 11 ft 2 in (3,404 mm)
  - Tender: 16 ft 8 in (5,080 mm)
  - Tender bogie: 5 ft 4 in (1,626 mm)
- Length
  - Over couplers: 62 ft 7 in (19,075 mm)
- Height: 12 ft 9 7/16 in (3,897 mm)
- Frame type: Bar
- Axle load: 16 LT 10 cwt (16,760 kg)
  - Leading: 10 LT 19 cwt (11,130 kg)
  - 1st coupled: 16 LT (16,260 kg)
  - 2nd coupled: 16 LT 10 cwt (16,760 kg)
  - 3rd coupled: 16 LT 3 cwt (16,410 kg)
  - Trailing: 12 LT 8 cwt (12,600 kg)
  - Tender axle: 11 LT 13 cwt 1 qtr (11,850 kg) av.
- Adhesive weight: 48 LT 13 cwt (49,430 kg)
- Loco weight: 72 LT (73,160 kg)
- Tender weight: 46 LT 13 cwt (47,400 kg)
- Total weight: 118 LT 13 cwt (120,600 kg)
- Tender type: 2-axle bogies
- Fuel type: Coal
- Fuel capacity: 10 LT (10.2 t)
- Water cap.: 4,000 imp gal (18,200 L)
- Firebox
  - Type: Belpaire
  - Grate area: 35 sq ft (3.3 m^{2})
- Boiler
  - Pitch: 7 ft 8 in (2,337 mm)
  - Diameter: 5 ft 3/4 in (1,543 mm)
  - Tube plates: 18 ft 3/8 in (5,496 mm)
  - Small tubes: 132: 2 1/4 in (57 mm)
  - Large tubes: 18 5 1/4 in (133 mm)
- Boiler pressure: 170 psi (1,172 kPa)
- Safety valve: Ramsbottom
- Heating surface
  - Firebox: 133 sq ft (12.4 m^{2})
  - Tubes: 1,848 sq ft (171.7 m^{2})
  - Total surface: 1,981 sq ft (184.0 m^{2})
- Superheater
  - Type: Cole
  - Heating area: 353 sq ft (32.8 m^{2})
- Cylinders: Two
- Cylinder size: 21 in (533 mm) bore 28 in (711 mm) stroke
- Valve gear: Walschaerts
- Valve type: Piston
- Valve travel: 5 1/2 in (140 mm)
- Valve lap: 1 in (25 mm)
- Valve lead: 1/4 in (6 mm)
- Couplers: Johnston link-and-pin
Performance figures
- Tractive effort: 25,390 lbf (112.9 kN) @ 75%
Career
- Operators: Central South African Railways; South African Railways
- Class: CSAR Class 10, SAR Class 10D
- Number in class: 1
- Numbers: CSAR 1002, SAR 779
- Delivered: 1910
- First run: 1910
- Withdrawn: 1931
- The 2nd coupled axle had flangeless wheels

The South African Railways Class 10D 4-6-2 of 1910 was a steam locomotive from the pre-Union era in Transvaal.

In 1910, the Central South African Railways placed one American-built Class 10 4-6-2 Pacific type steam locomotive in service. When the South African Railways classification and renumbering took place in 1912, this locomotive was designated the sole member of Class 10D.

== Manufacturer ==
One 4-6-2 Pacific type passenger locomotive was ordered by the Central South African Railways (CSAR) from the American Locomotive Company (ALCO) in 1910. It was built to very much the same specifications as that of the CSAR Class 10-2 of that same year, which was designed by CSAR Chief Mechanical Engineer (CME) G.G. Elliot.

The locomotive was slightly more powerful than the Class 10-2 and was designated Class 10 by the CSAR, with engine number 1002, along with the fifteen CSAR Class 10 4-6-2 locomotives which had been built by the North British Locomotive Company in 1904.

== Characteristics ==
The cylinders were arranged outside the 4 inches (102 millimetres) thick bar frames, while the piston valves, arranged above the cylinders, were actuated by Walschaerts valve gear. Reversing was effected by means of a screw gear. The locomotive had a Belpaire firebox and, instead of the usual deep bridle casting, was built with a shallow casting and frame under the firebox. This permitted all firebox stays to be removed without lifting the boiler from the frame.

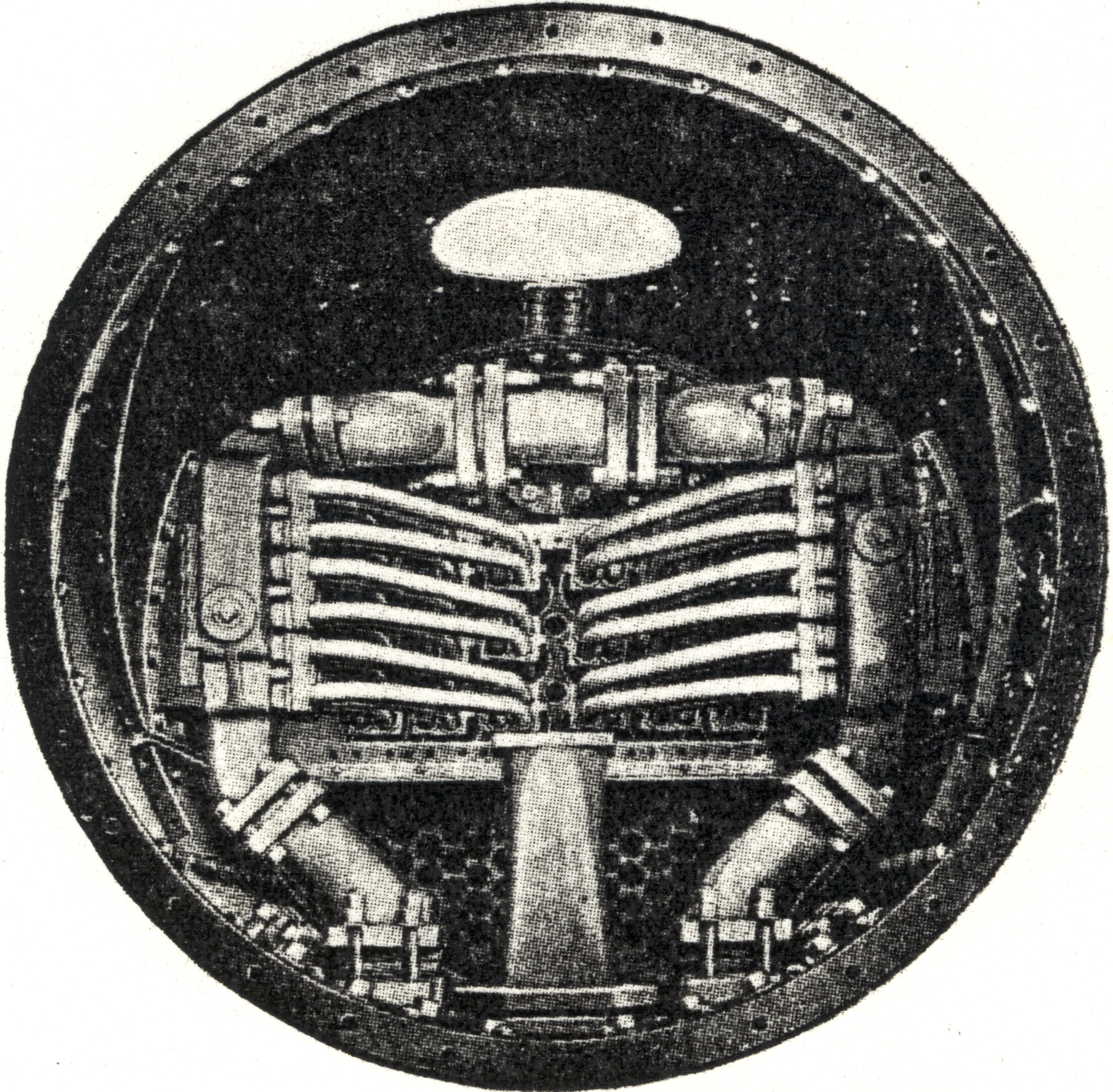
Cole type superheater header

The locomotive was superheated, using the Cole double-header superheater system. The Cole superheater was somewhat similar to the Schmidt superheater system, except that the Cole type had two headers arranged at either side of the smokebox instead of one at the top.

Each of the eighteen 5 1/4 inches (133 millimetres) diameter boiler flues contained four lengths of seamless steam pipes of 1 1/2 inches (38 millimetres) outside diameter, arranged in double pairs which were connected at the back ends by return bends and with the two pairs connected to each other at the front by another return bend. This forced the steam to traverse the entire four pipe lengths before entering the steam chests. The two free front ends of each such foursome of pipes were bent around to meet the steam headers. This design of superheater produced a superheat of from 175 to 250 degrees Fahrenheit (79 to 121 degrees Celsius) above saturation temperature.

== South African Railways ==
When the Union of South Africa was established on 31 May 1910, the three Colonial government railways (Cape Government Railways, Natal Government Railways and CSAR) were united under a single administration to control and administer the railways, ports and harbours of the Union. Although the South African Railways and Harbours came into existence in 1910, the actual classification and renumbering of all the rolling stock of the three constituent railways were only implemented with effect from 1 January 1912.

In 1912, the sixteen CSAR Class 10 locomotives were renumbered on the South African Railways (SAR) roster. The fifteen older British-built locomotives retained their Class 10 designation on the SAR roster, but the ALCO-built engine was designated the sole member of Class 10D and renumbered 779.

== Service ==
The Class 10D was placed in service on fast passenger work in the Transvaal and later in the Orange Free State. It spent its last working years at Bloemfontein until it was withdrawn from service in 1931 and scrapped.

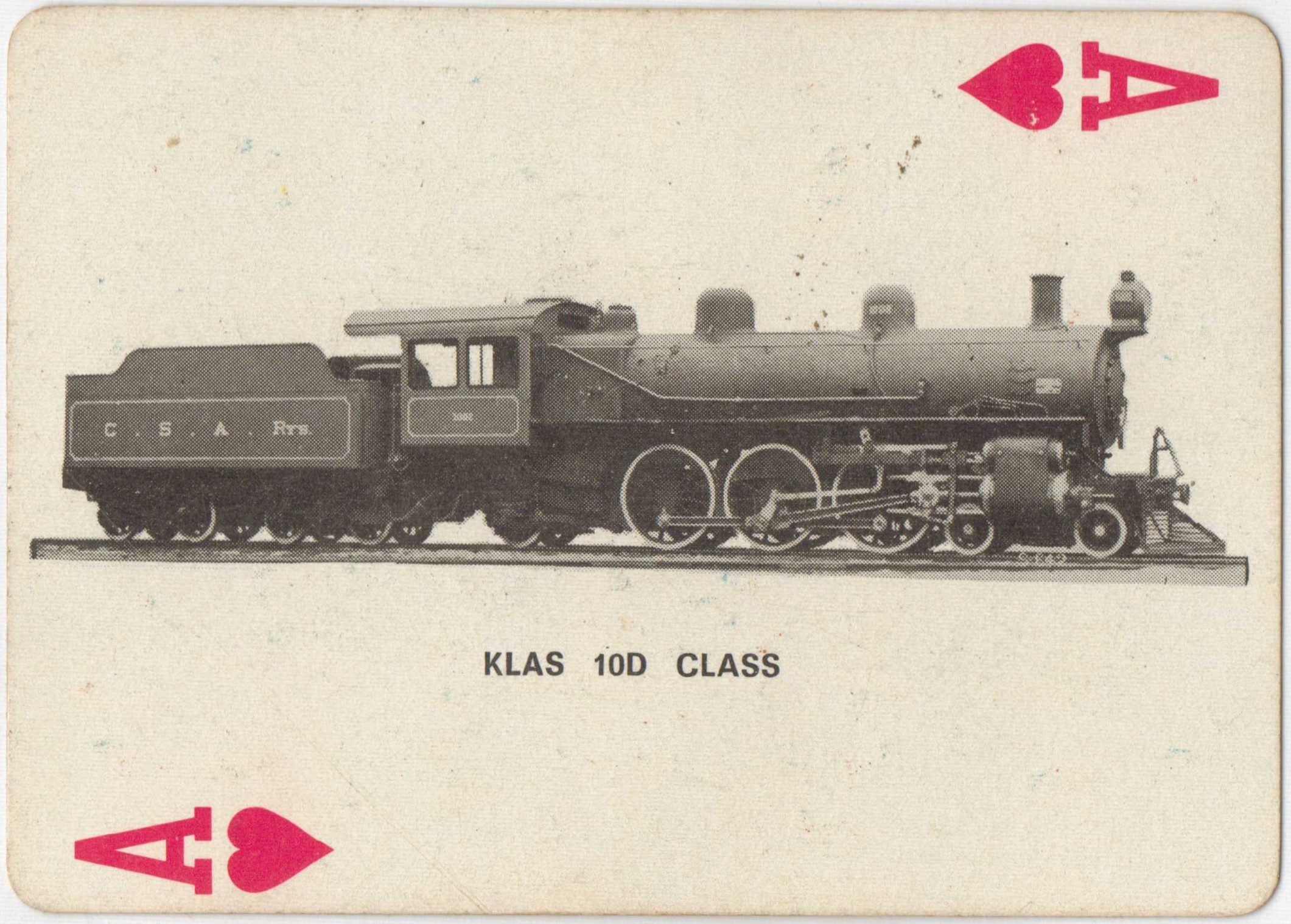
Class 10D 779 (4-6-2) - Ex CSAR 1002, on a SAR Museum Playing Card
