= CGR NG 4-6-2T =

South African narrow-gauge steam locomotive

CGR NG 4-6-2T South African NG 4-6-2T
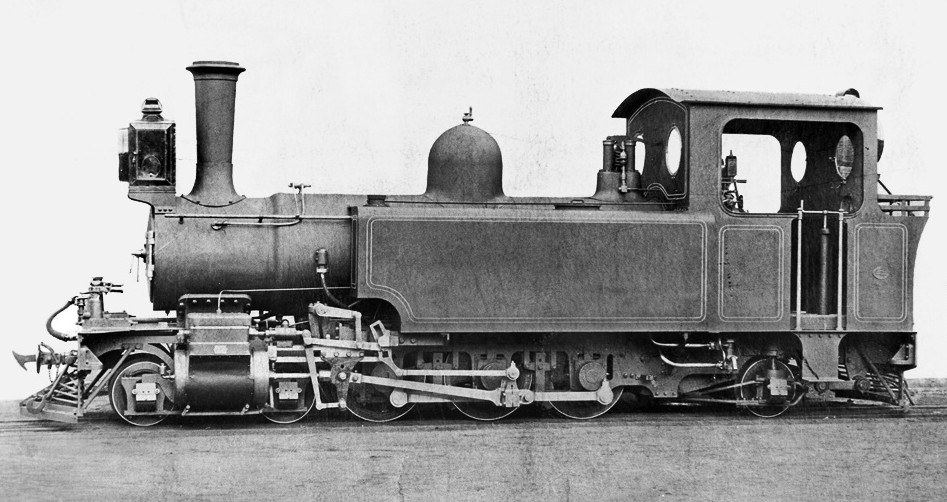
- CGR narrow-gauge 4-6-2T
Type and origin
- Power type: Steam
- Designer: W.G. Bagnall
- Builder: W.G. Bagnall
- Serial number: 1866-1867
- Build date: May & June 1908 (ex works)
Specifications
- Configuration
  - Whyte: 4-6-2T
  - UIC: 2'C1'n2t
- Driver: 2nd coupled axle
- Gauge: 2 ft (610 mm) narrow
- Leading dia.: 22 in (559 mm)
- Coupled dia.: 33 in (838 mm)
- Trailing dia.: 22 in (559 mm)
- Wheelbase: 19 ft 1 in (5,817 mm)
  - Axle spacing (Asymmetrical): 1-2: 3 ft 3 in (991 mm); 2-3: 3 ft (914 mm)
  - Leading: 4 ft (1,219 mm)
  - Coupled: 6 ft 3 in (1,905 mm)
- Length
  - Over couplers: 27 ft 8 in (8,433 mm)
- Height: 10 ft 6 in (3,200 mm)
- Frame type: Bar
- Axle load: 7 LT 1 cwt 1 qtr (7,176 kg)
  - Leading: 3 LT (3,048 kg)
  - 1st coupled: 6 LT 16 cwt 1 qtr (6,922 kg)
  - 2nd coupled: 7 LT 1 cwt 1 qtr (7,176 kg)
  - 3rd coupled: 6 LT 16 cwt 1 qtr (6,922 kg)
- Loco weight: 28 LT 13 cwt 3 qtr (29,150 kg)
- Fuel type: Coal
- Fuel capacity: 1 LT (1.0 t)
- Water cap.: 550 imp gal (2,500 L)
- Firebox
  - Type: Round-top
  - Grate area: 7.6 sq ft (0.71 m^{2})
- Boiler
  - Pitch: 4 ft 10 1/2 in (1,486 mm)
  - Diameter: 3 ft 2 1/8 in (968 mm)
- Boiler pressure: 180 psi (1,241 kPa)
- Safety valve: Ramsbottom
- Heating surface
  - Firebox: 38.9 sq ft (3.61 m^{2})
- Cylinders: Two
- Cylinder size: 11 3/4 in (298 mm) bore 16 in (406 mm) stroke
- Valve gear: Walschaerts
- Couplers: Bell-and-hook
Performance figures
- Tractive effort: 9,032 lbf (40.18 kN) @ 75%
Career
- Operators: Cape Government Railways; South African Railways
- Number in class: 2
- Numbers: CGR 42-43, SAR NG33-NG34
- Delivered: 1908
- First run: 1908
- Withdrawn: 1929
- The 2nd coupled axle had flangeless wheels

The Cape Government Railways NG 4-6-2T of 1908 was a South African narrow-gauge steam locomotive from the pre-Union era in the Cape of Good Hope.

In 1908, the Cape Government Railways placed two 4-6-2T Pacific type narrow-gauge steam locomotives in passenger service on the Walmer branch in Port Elizabeth. In 1912, both locomotives were assimilated into the South African Railways and renumbered.

== Manufacturer ==
Two 4-6-2T narrow-gauge steam locomotives were built for the Cape Government Railways (CGR) by W. G. Bagnall in 1908. The engines were equally powerful tank locomotive versions of the CGR Type B 4-6-0 narrow-gauge tender locomotive of 1904, also built by Bagnall, but with Walschaerts instead of Stephenson valve gear. They were not classified and were numbered 42 and 43.

== Characteristics ==
The locomotives had bar frames like their Type B 4-6-0 counterparts. The middle drivers were flangeless to negotiate sharp curves. The coupled wheels were unequally spaced together, with 39 inches (991 millimetres) between the leading driver and the centre and 36 inches (914 millimetres) between the centre and the trailing driver.

== Service ==
=== Cape Government Railways ===
In 1906, a passenger-only suburban branch line had been opened from Valley Junction, near Port Elizabeth on the Avontuur line, to the suburb of Walmer. It was used by up to 22 trains per day. Both locomotives were placed in service on the Walmer branch line.

=== South African Railways ===
When the Union of South Africa was established on 31 May 1910, the three Colonial government railways (CGR, Natal Government Railways and Central South African Railways) were united under a single administration to control and administer the railways, ports and harbours of the Union. Although the South African Railways and Harbours came into existence in 1910, the actual classification and renumbering of all the rolling stock of the three constituent railways were only implemented with effect from 1 January 1912.

In 1912, the two locomotives were renumbered no. NG33 and NG34 on the South African Railways (SAR), with the "NG" number prefix identifying them as narrow-gauge locomotives in the SAR registers. They remained in service on the Walmer branch for the duration of their service lives, until the line was closed in 1929. They were then withdrawn from service, shortly before a classification system for narrow-gauge locomotives was to be introduced by the SAR.
