= South African Class 3A 4-8-2 =

1910 design of steam locomotive

NGR Class B 4-8-2 1910 South African Class 3A 4-8-2
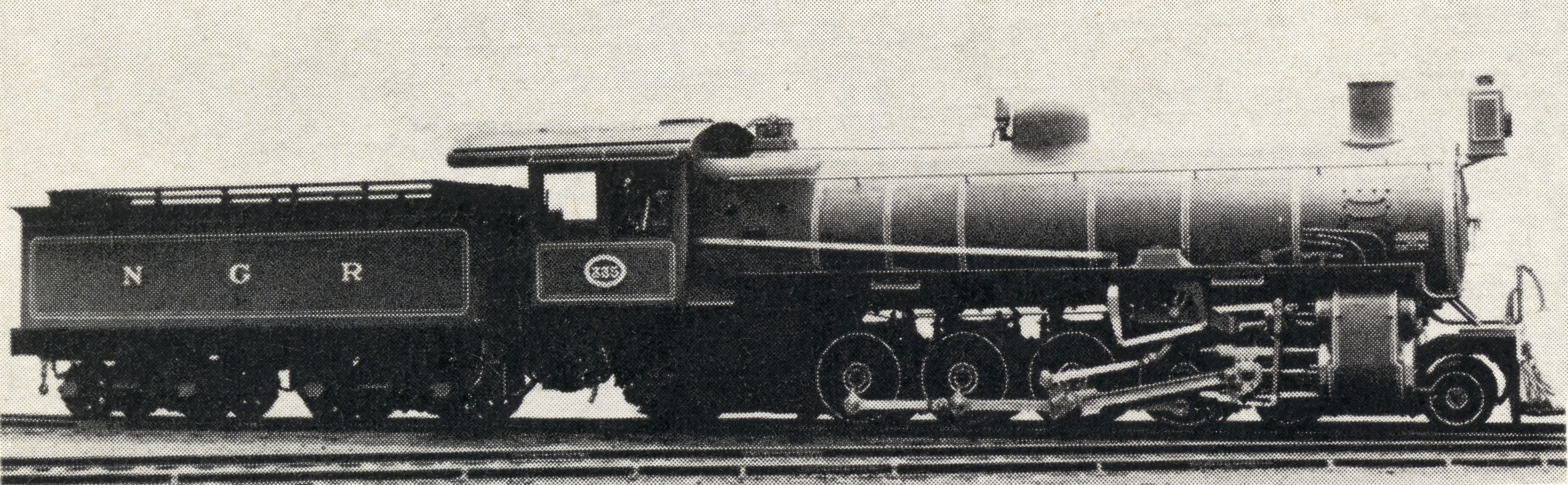
- NGR Class B no. 335, SAR Class 3A no. 1476
Type and origin
- Power type: Steam
- Designer: American Locomotive Company
- Builder: American Locomotive Company
- Serial number: 46176
- Model: NGR America D
- Build date: 1909
- Total produced: 1
Specifications
- Configuration
  - Whyte: 4-8-2 (Mountain)
  - UIC: 2'D1'h2
- Driver: 2nd coupled axle
- Gauge: 3 ft 6 in (1,067 mm) Cape gauge
- Leading dia.: 28 1/2 in (724 mm)
- Coupled dia.: 45 1/2 in (1,156 mm)
- Trailing dia.: 30 in (762 mm)
- Tender wheels: 30 in (762 mm)
- Wheelbase: 57 ft 7 in (17,551 mm)
  - Engine: 30 ft 6 in (9,296 mm)
  - Leading: 6 ft (1,829 mm)
  - Coupled: 12 ft 9 in (3,886 mm)
  - Tender: 17 ft 10 in (5,436 mm)
  - Tender bogie: 5 ft 10 in (1,778 mm)
- Length
  - Over couplers: 65 ft 5 7/8 in (19,961 mm)
- Height: 12 ft 6 in (3,810 mm)
- Frame type: Bar
- Axle load: 14 LT 11 cwt (14,780 kg)
  - Leading: 11 LT 16 cwt (11,990 kg)
  - 1st coupled: 13 LT 14 cwt 2 qtr (13,950 kg)
  - 2nd coupled: 13 LT 18 cwt 2 qtr (14,150 kg)
  - 3rd coupled: 13 LT 9 cwt (13,670 kg)
  - 4th coupled: 14 LT 11 cwt (14,780 kg)
  - Trailing: 9 LT 1 cwt (9,195 kg)
  - Tender bogie: Bogie 1: 20 LT 7 cwt (20,680 kg); Bogie 2: 22 LT 10 cwt (22,860 kg)
- Adhesive weight: 55 LT 13 cwt (56,540 kg)
- Loco weight: 76 LT 10 cwt (77,730 kg)
- Tender weight: 42 LT 17 cwt (43,540 kg)
- Total weight: 119 LT 7 cwt (121,300 kg)
- Tender type: 2-axle bogies
- Fuel type: Coal
- Fuel capacity: 8 LT 5 cwt (8.4 t)
- Water cap.: 4,000 imp gal (18,200 L)
- Firebox
  - Type: Belpaire
  - Grate area: 36.25 sq ft (3.368 m^{2})
- Boiler
  - Pitch: 7 ft 4 in (2,235 mm)
  - Diameter: 5 ft 4 5/8 in (1,641 mm)
  - Tube plates: 18 ft 7 3/8 in (5,674 mm)
  - Small tubes: 172: 2 1/4 in (57 mm)
  - Large tubes: 15: 5 1/4 in (133 mm)
- Boiler pressure: 160 psi (1,103 kPa)
- Safety valve: Ramsbottom
- Heating surface
  - Firebox: 149 sq ft (13.8 m^{2})
  - Tubes: 2,268 sq ft (210.7 m^{2})
  - Total surface: 2,417 sq ft (224.5 m^{2})
- Superheater
  - Type: Cole
  - Heating area: 457 sq ft (42.5 m^{2})
- Cylinders: Two
- Cylinder size: 24 in (610 mm) bore 24 in (610 mm) stroke
- Valve gear: Walschaerts
- Valve type: Piston
- Couplers: Johnston link-and-pin AAR knuckle (1930s)
Performance figures
- Tractive effort: 36,460 lbf (162.2 kN) @ 75%
Career
- Operators: Natal Government Railways; South African Railways
- Class: NGR Class B SAR Class 3A
- Number in class: 1
- Numbers: NGR 335, SAR 1476
- Nicknames: Maud Allan
- Delivered: 1910
- First run: 1910
- Withdrawn: 1935
- The leading coupled axle had flangeless wheels

The South African Railways Class 3A 4-8-2 of 1910 was a steam locomotive from the pre-Union era in the Colony of Natal.

Early in 1910, the Natal Government Railways commissioned a single American-built Class B 4-8-2 Mountain type locomotive, also known as the America D. It was the first superheated locomotive to be acquired by the Railways in Natal and also the first with a bar frame. In 1912, when it was assimilated into the South African Railways, it was renumbered and designated Class 3A.

== Manufacturer ==
As a result of a visit to the United States of America by Natal Government Railways (NGR) Locomotive Superintendent D.A. Hendrie in 1909 to study Mallet type locomotives and also American locomotive design in general, the American Locomotive Company (ALCO) supplied the NGR with two experimental locomotives. These engines represented a radical departure from previous NGR locomotive designs.

One of them was the first Mallet type locomotive in South Africa, later to be designated Class MA on the South African Railways (SAR).

The other was a 4-8-2 Mountain type locomotive which was placed in service early in 1910. It was of very similar general proportions to the NGR Class B of 1909, also known as the Hendrie D. While the ALCO locomotive was also designated Class B, it was commonly known as the America D on the NGR and nicknamed Maud Allan by the enginemen after the Canadian-born dancer.

== Characteristics ==
Like the Class B Hendrie D, the ALCO locomotive also used Walschaerts valve gear, but it had a bar frame, larger 24 inches (610 millimetres) diameter pistons, lower 160 pounds per square inch (1,103 kilopascals) boiler pressure, superheating, an American type cab and some other features which were typical of American design, such as high running boards. It was the first superheated locomotive to be acquired by the NGR and also the first with a bar frame.

=== Superheating ===
At the time, the advantages to be gained by superheating were gradually becoming apparent as the most practical means of improving engine power and efficiency. Superheating was considered the greatest step forward regarding improved performance and efficiency in steam locomotives. The claims that superheating could effect a saving of from 10% to 20% in fuel and from 15% to 25% in water were not unfounded and were even improved upon in later years. Experience with the Class B America D proved, when compared with the saturated steam Class B Hendrie D, that it was more economical in fuel and water consumption.

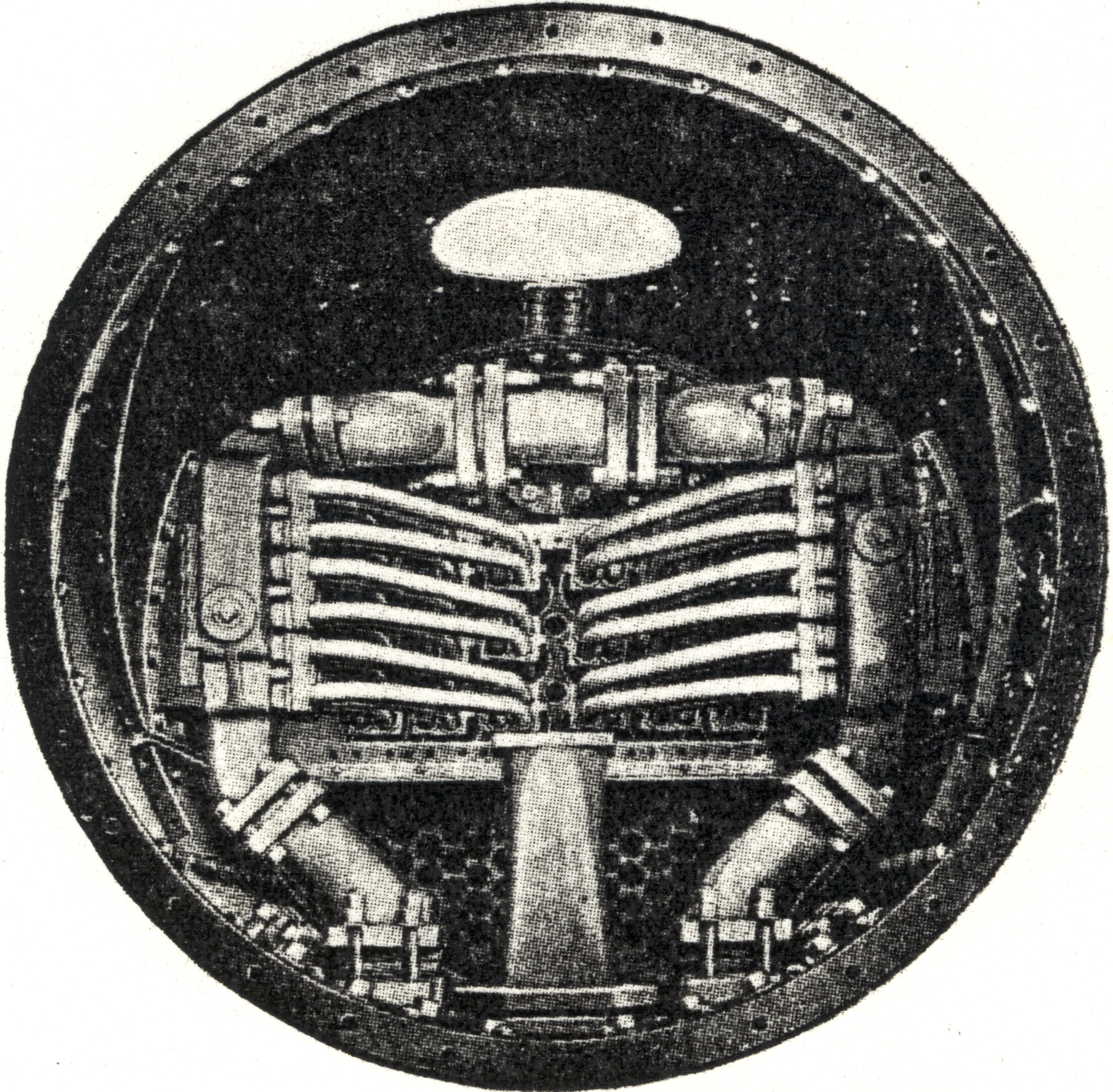
Cole type superheater header

The locomotive's superheater was of the Cole type, which was somewhat similar to the Schmidt system, except that the Cole type had two headers arranged at either side of the smokebox instead of one at the top. Each of the fifteen 5 1/4 inches (133 millimetres) diameter boiler flues contained four lengths of seamless steam pipes of 1 1/2 inches (38 millimetres) outside diameter, arranged in double pairs which were connected at the back ends by return bends and with the two pairs connected to each other at the front by another return bend. This forced the steam to traverse the entire four pipe lengths before entering the steam chests. The two free front ends of each such foursome of pipes were bent around to meet the steam headers. This design of superheater produced a superheat of from 175 to 250 degrees Fahrenheit (79 to 121 degrees Celsius) above saturation temperature.

The passage of gases through the large flues and around the superheating pipes was controlled by a damper, which was automatically operated by a steam cylinder connected directly to the steam chest. When the throttle was opened, the pressure in the steam chest would open the damper, which would be closed again by a counterweight when steam was shut off. Superheater dampers were used for many years until it was determined that damping was unnecessary, since the life of the superheating elements was not increased appreciably by their use. On the SAR, the use of superheater dampers was discontinued c. 1924.

=== Factor of adhesion ===
The locomotive had larger diameter cylinders than the Class B Hendrie D, but its adhesive weight was 2 long tons 15 hundredweight (2,794 kilograms) less. The result was that its factor of adhesion was found to be on the low side for the service for which it was required. The locomotive was prone to slipping when the rails were wet, which often happened in Natal when the weather was misty.

== Service ==
The locomotive joined the Class B Hendrie D locomotives, working between Estcourt and Charlestown on the Transvaal border.

When the Union of South Africa was established on 31 May 1910, the three Colonial government railways (Cape Government Railways, NGR and Central South African Railways) were united under a single administration to control and administer the railways, ports and harbours of the Union. Although the South African Railways and Harbours came into existence in 1910, the actual classification and renumbering of all the rolling stock of the three constituent railways were only implemented with effect from 1 January 1912.

In 1912, the locomotive was renumbered 1476 and designated the sole member of Class 3A on the SAR. It was withdrawn from service in 1935.
