= South African Class MA 2-6-6-0 =

1909 articulated steam locomotive

NGR Mallet 2-6-6-0 1909 South African Class MA 2-6-6-0
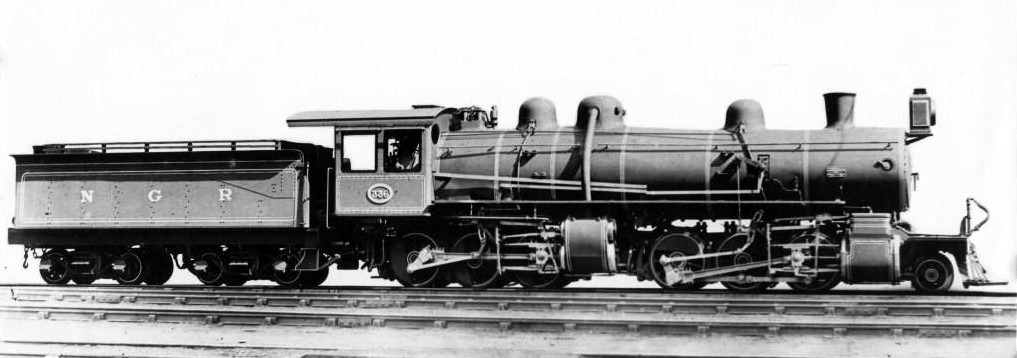
- NGR Mallet no. 336, SAR Class MA no. 1601, c. 1909
Type and origin
- Power type: Steam
- Designer: American Locomotive Company
- Builder: American Locomotive Company
- Serial number: 46044
- Model: NGR Mallet
- Build date: 1909
- Total produced: 1
Specifications
- Configuration
  - Whyte: 2-6-6-0 (Denver)
  - UIC: (1'C)Cnv4
- Driver: 3rd & 6th coupled axles
- Gauge: 3 ft 6 in (1,067 mm) Cape gauge
- Leading dia.: 28 1/2 in (724 mm)
- Coupled dia.: 45 1/2 in (1,156 mm)
- Tender wheels: 30 in (762 mm)
- Wheelbase: 60 ft 2 3/4 in (18,358 mm)
  - Engine: 33 ft 2 in (10,109 mm)
  - Coupled: 8 ft 4 in (2,540 mm) per unit
  - Tender: 17 ft 10 in (5,436 mm)
  - Tender bogie: 5 ft 10 in (1,778 mm)
- Length
  - Over couplers: 68 ft 2 3/8 in (20,787 mm)
- Height: 12 ft 5 1/8 in (3,788 mm)
- Frame type: Bar
- Axle load: 13 LT 18 cwt (14,120 kg)
  - Leading: 6 LT 17 cwt (6,960 kg)
  - 1st coupled: 12 LT 14 cwt (12,900 kg)
  - 2nd coupled: 13 LT 18 cwt (14,120 kg)
  - 3rd coupled: 13 LT 6 cwt 2 qtr (13,540 kg)
  - 4th coupled: 13 LT 2 cwt (13,310 kg)
  - 5th coupled: 12 LT 18 cwt (13,110 kg)
  - 6th coupled: 13 LT 16 cwt (14,020 kg)
  - Tender bogie: Bogie 1: 20 LT 7 cwt (20,680 kg); Bogie 2: 22 LT 10 cwt (22,860 kg)
- Adhesive weight: 79 LT 14 cwt 2 qtr (81,000 kg)
- Loco weight: 86 LT 11 cwt 2 qtr (87,960 kg)
- Tender weight: 42 LT 17 cwt (43,540 kg)
- Total weight: 129 LT 8 cwt 2 qtr (131,500 kg)
- Tender type: 2-axle bogies
- Fuel type: Coal
- Fuel capacity: 8 LT 5 cwt (8.4 t)
- Water cap.: 4,000 imp gal (18,000 L)
- Firebox
  - Type: Round-top & combustion chamber
  - Grate area: 40 sq ft (3.7 m^{2})
- Boiler
  - Pitch: 7 ft 4 in (2,235 mm)
  - Diameter: 5 ft 4 in (1,626 mm)
  - Tube plates: 17 ft 10 1/2 in (5,448 mm)
  - Small tubes: 230: 2 1/4 in (57 mm)
- Boiler pressure: 200 psi (1,379 kPa)
- Safety valve: Ramsbottom
- Heating surface
  - Firebox: 125 sq ft (11.6 m^{2})
  - Tubes: 2,422 sq ft (225.0 m^{2})
  - Total surface: 2,574 sq ft (239.1 m^{2})
- Cylinders: Four
- High-pressure cylinder: 17 1/2 in (444 mm) bore 26 in (660 mm) stroke
- Low-pressure cylinder: 28 in (711 mm) bore 26 in (660 mm) stroke
- Valve gear: Walschaerts
- Valve type: HP: Piston; LP: Richardson balanced slide
- Valve travel: HP: 5 in (127 mm); LP: 5 1/2 in (140 mm)
- Valve lap: HP: 1 in (25 mm); LP: 7/8 in (22 mm)
- Valve lead: HP & LP: 3/16 in (5 mm)
- Couplers: Johnston link-and-pin
Performance figures
- Tractive effort: 44,810 lbf (199.3 kN) @ 50%
Career
- Operators: Natal Government Railways; South African Railways
- Class: NGR Mallet; SAR Class MA
- Number in class: 1
- Numbers: NGR 336, SAR 1601
- Delivered: 1909
- First run: 1909
- Withdrawn: 1927

The South African Railways Class MA 2-6-6-0 of 1909 was a steam locomotive from the pre-Union era in the Natal Colony.

In 1909, the Natal Government Railways placed a single 2-6-6-0 Mallet articulated compound steam locomotive in service. In 1912, when it was assimilated into the South African Railways, it was renumbered and designated Class MA.

== Manufacturer ==
As a result of a visit to the United States of America by Natal Government Railways (NGR) Locomotive Superintendent D.A. Hendrie in 1909 to study Mallet type locomotives and also American locomotive design in general, the American Locomotive Company (ALCO) supplied the NGR with two experimental locomotives which represented a radical departure from previous NGR locomotive designs. One was the NGR Class B America D, later to be designated the Class 3A on the South African Railways (SAR), while the other was the first Mallet type articulated compound steam locomotive in South Africa.

== Mallet advantages ==
The main advantages of the Mallet locomotive type were articulation and compound expansion.

Articulation

The object with an articulated locomotive is to distribute traction power over a larger number of driving wheels with a flexible wheelbase. On the Mallet type, the boiler was fixed to the frame of the rear engine unit, as on a regular steam locomotive. The front engine unit carried the boiler barrel by means of a large supporting bracket, attached to the underside of the barrel and carried on a slide, fixed to the front engine unit's frame. On curves, the front engine unit could move several inches laterally under the boiler barrel. Side control springs acted as a centering device for the engine unit.

Compound expansion

In a compound expansion (compound) locomotive, steam is expanded in phases. After being expanded in a high-pressure cylinder and having then lost pressure and given up part of its heat, it is exhausted into a larger-volume low-pressure cylinder for secondary expansion, after which it is exhausted through the smokebox.

By comparison, in the more usual arrangement of simple expansion (simplex), steam is expanded just once in any one cylinder before being exhausted through the smokebox.

In the compound Mallet locomotive, the rear set of coupled wheels are driven by the smaller high-pressure cylinders, from which spent steam is then fed to the larger low-pressure cylinders which drive the front set of coupled wheels.

== Characteristics ==
The NGR 2-6-6-0 Mallet locomotive had Walschaerts valve gear, a bar frame and used saturated steam. It was the first articulated compound steam locomotive to enter service in South Africa and its design and large proportions represented a big advance in motive power on Cape gauge. At the time, it was the most powerful locomotive in the country.

Copper steam pipes, 4 1/2 inches (114 millimetres) in internal diameter, were arranged from each side of the steam dome and passed vertically down the outside of the boiler to the steam chests of the high-pressure cylinders. The exhaust from the high-pressure cylinders passed to a receiver pipe, 7 1/2 inches (191 millimetres) in internal diameter, arranged along the centre line of the locomotive and with a ball-joint at the connection with the high-pressure cylinder casting. The front end of the pipe was fitted with an expansion joint near the connection which led to the steam chests of the low-pressure cylinders. The exhaust from the low-pressure cylinders was carried by a pipe, also 7 1/2 inches (191 millimetres) in internal diameter, with flexible connections leading into the smokebox.

The high-pressure cylinders were fitted with 10 inches (254 millimetres) diameter piston valves and had a bore of 17 1/2 inches (444 millimetres), while the low-pressure cylinders were fitted with Richardson balanced slide valves and had a bore of 28 inches (711 millimetres). Both sets of cylinders had a stroke of 26 inches (660 millimetres).

An intercepting valve was arranged in the high-pressure cylinder casting, through which the engine could be worked in simplex mode when required. Upon starting, the valve would feed boiler steam directly to the low-pressure cylinders for a few revolutions of the coupled wheels, just sufficient to give the engine additional power at starting, after which it automatically cut off and the working would become compound. By means of a steam cock in the cab, the driver could also admit boiler steam to the low-pressure cylinders for additional power while ascending steep inclines.

The tender rode on diamond-frame four-wheeled bogies and was equipped with a glass water gauge on the side of the tender tank, the first time such a device had been used in South Africa.

== Performance ==
While the results obtained in service were encouraging, it could possibly have been improved if the locomotive had been superheated. Even so, the locomotive's performance was good enough to warrant subsequent orders by the NGR for a further five slightly larger and more powerful compound Mallets.

The Mallet type gradually fell into disfavour, however, as a result of their high cost of repairs, low mileage between heavy repairs, high initial cost and the difficulties of obtaining a reasonably high sustained speed from them, in comparison to the excellent performance of the non-articulated tender engines which were being introduced by D.A. Hendrie of the NGR and H.M. Beatty of the Cape Government Railways (CGR) at the time. The Mallets seemed to "choke" after a certain speed had been reached, a problem attributed to their long steam pipes and tortuous steam passages. In some cases, where Mallets worked on the same sections and to the same time schedules as non-articulated locomotives, they showed a higher rate of wear and tear and a higher rate of breakdown than the non-articulated types. Furthermore, when the four-cylinder simplex Garratt articulated type was introduced after the First World War, it soon showed that it had definite advantages over the Mallet under South African conditions.

== Service ==
The locomotive was placed in service as a banking engine, working heavy coal trains between Estcourt and Highlands on the Natal mainline. This section was about 28 miles (45 kilometres) long with a gradient of nearly 1 in 30 (3⅓%) uncompensated throughout, which made it, in effect, equivalent to a gradient of about 1 in 25 (4%).

When the Union of South Africa was established on 31 May 1910, the three Colonial government railways (CGR, NGR and Central South African Railways) were united under a single administration to control and administer the railways, ports and harbours of the Union. Although the South African Railways and Harbours came into existence in 1910, the actual classification and renumbering of all the rolling stock of the three constituent railways were only implemented with effect from 1 January 1912.

In 1912, the NGR 2-6-6-0 Mallet was renumbered 1601 and classified as the sole Class MA locomotive on the SAR. It was withdrawn from service in 1927.
