= 2-6-6-0 =

Articulated locomotive wheel arrangement

- Front of locomotive at left

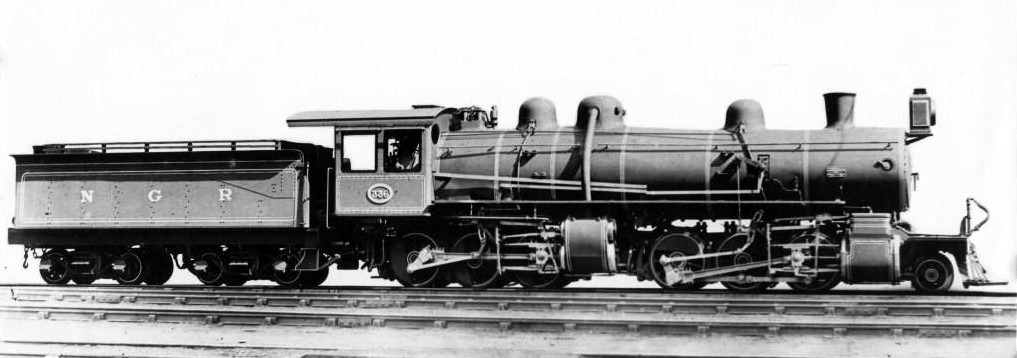
- NGR Mallet 2-6-6-0 of 1909
Equivalent classifications
- UIC class: (1C)C, (1'C)C
- French class: 130+030
- Turkish class: 34+33
- Swiss class: 3/4+3/3
- Russian class: 1-3-0+0-3-0
First known tank engine version
- First use: 1904
- Country: Dutch East Indies (Indonesia)
- Locomotive: SS Class 520 (DKA CC10)
- Railway: Staatsspoorwegen
- Designer: Sachsische Maschinenfabrik (Hartmann)
- Builder: Sachsische Maschinenfabrik
First known tender engine version
- First use: 1909
- Country: Colony of Natal
- Locomotive: NGR 2-6-6-0, SAR Class MA
- Railway: Natal Government Railways
- Designer: American Locomotive Company
- Builder: American Locomotive Company

Under the Whyte notation for the classification of steam locomotives by wheel arrangement, 2-6-6-0 is a locomotive with one pair of unpowered leading wheels, followed by two sets of three pairs of powered driving wheels and no trailing wheels. The wheel arrangement was principally used on Mallet-type articulated locomotives. Some tank locomotive examples were also built, for which various suffixes to indicate the type of tank would be added to the wheel arrangement, for example 2-6-6-0T for an engine with side-tanks.

== Overview ==
The 2-6-6-0 wheel arrangement was most often used for articulated compound steam Mallet locomotives. In a compound Mallet, the rear set of coupled wheels are driven by the smaller high pressure cylinders, from which spent steam is then fed to the larger low pressure cylinders that drive the front set of coupled wheels.

== Usage ==
=== Indonesia ===
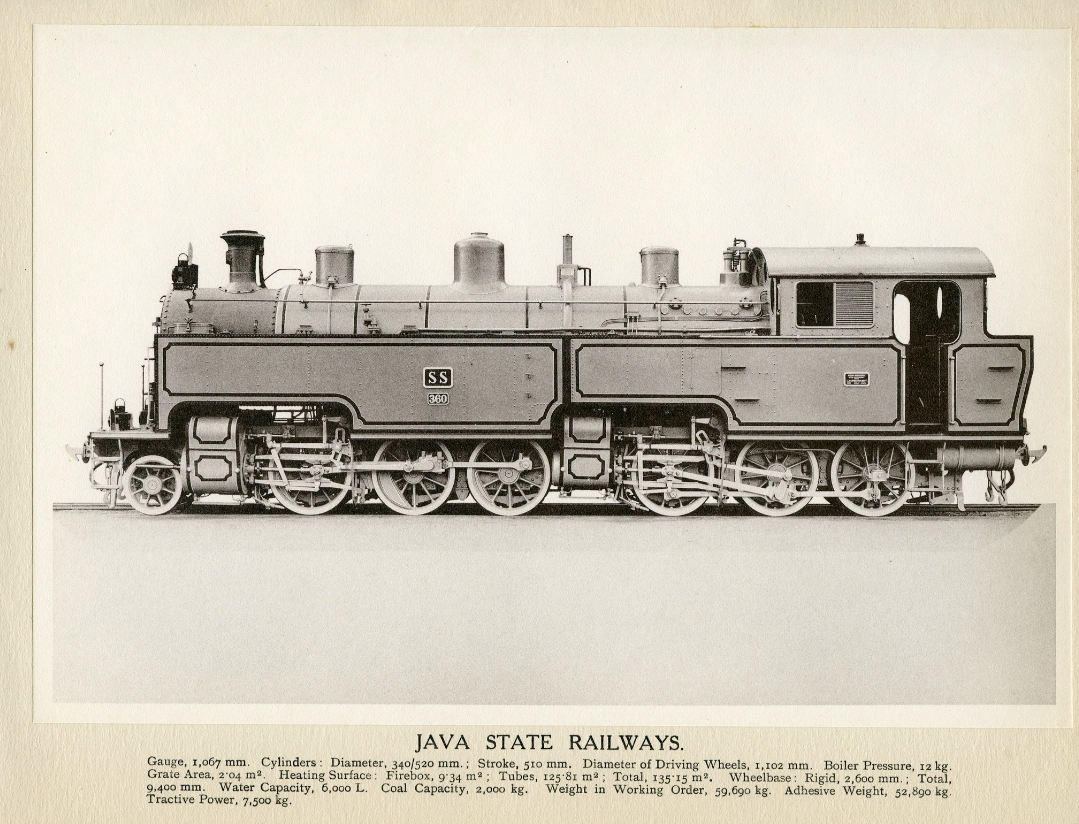
First batch of 2-6-6-0T used by Java Staatsspoorwegen (State Railway)

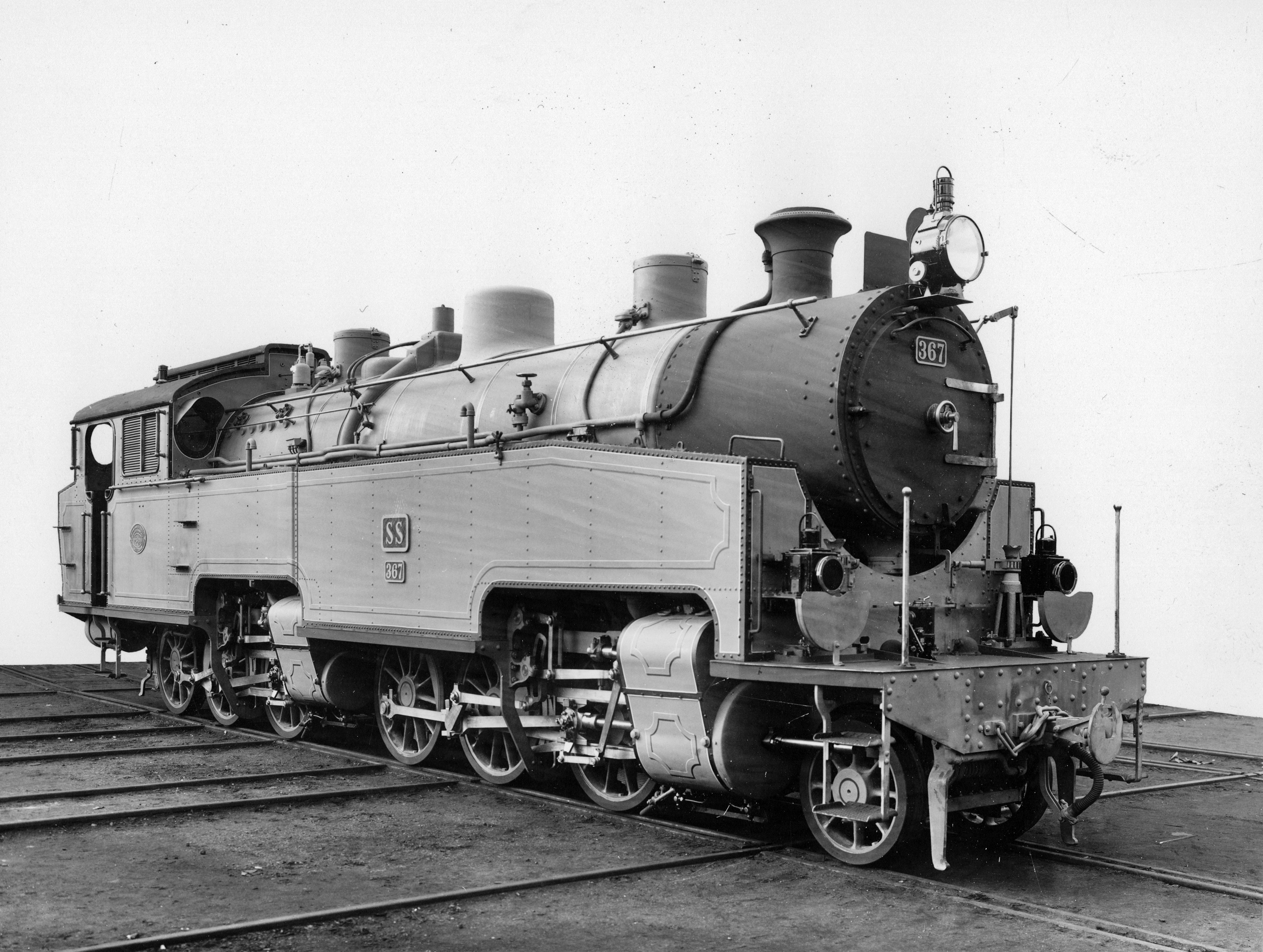
Second batch of 2-6-6-0T Java State Railway from Werkspoor

The Java Staatsspoorwegen (SS/JSS) operated its first of 2-6-6-0Ts in the 1904. The first batch was delivered between 1904 and 1909 from Schwartzkopff and Hartmann. The second batch, delivered between 1910 and 1911, was built by Werkspoor. The front water tanks of the first batch are square, those on the second batch are sloped. These were successor of the first Mallets the 0-4-4-2T SS Class 500s (DKA BB10s), which were delivered in 1900 and worked on the 3 ft 6 in (1,067 mm) gauge heavy mountain lines of West Java. Just after arrived on Java, these engines classified as SS Class 312–387, but later renumbered as SS Class 520 (521–543) and worked for mixed passenger and freight trains on Purwakarta–Bandung and Cicalengka–Banjar lines. After Japanese occupation and Indonesian Independence, these locomotives were renumbered to CC10 and used by Djawatan Kereta Api (DKA / The Department of Railway), also known as the Indonesian State Railway. By the end of the service, the CC10s were allocated in Rangkasbitung and Cibatu depots. All of CC10s were withdrawn from active service in 1980s and scrapped.

In 1927–1928, the Java Staatsspoorwegen imported 16 2-6-6-0 Mallet locomotives from the Swiss Locomotive and Machine Works and 14 from Werkspoor for the mountain lines in West Java. These were a compact version of the Bull Moose 2-8-8-0 SS Class 1250 (DKA DD52). They worked on Cibatu–Garut–Cikajang and Purwakarta–Padalarang lines. The experience gained by the SS modifying earlier Mallets helped them design these locomotives to use standard parts that could be exchanged with other SS locomotives. These locomotives also known as De Bergkoningin or The Queen of the Mountain. They were known as Si Gombar by locals due to the ability on the mountain lines and its huge size. The Class 1600 proved more powerful than other SS locomotives, and able to haul trains weighing 1,300 tons at a speed of 55 kilometres per hour (34 mph), and being able to negotiate tight curves. These locomotives were used throughout Java. During the Japanese occupation of the Dutch East Indies in 1942, all of SS locomotives were renumbered based on the Japanese numberings. The Class 1600s were renumbered CC50. This numbering system remained in use after the Independence of Indonesia by Djawatan Kereta Api (DKA). By 1971, these locomotives were located at Cibatu, Banjar, Purwakarta, Purwokerto, Ambarawa, Madiun and Sidotopo (Surabaya) locomotive depots. The last operational units of the class was based at Cibatu and they were withdrawn from service in 1984.

==== Preservation ====
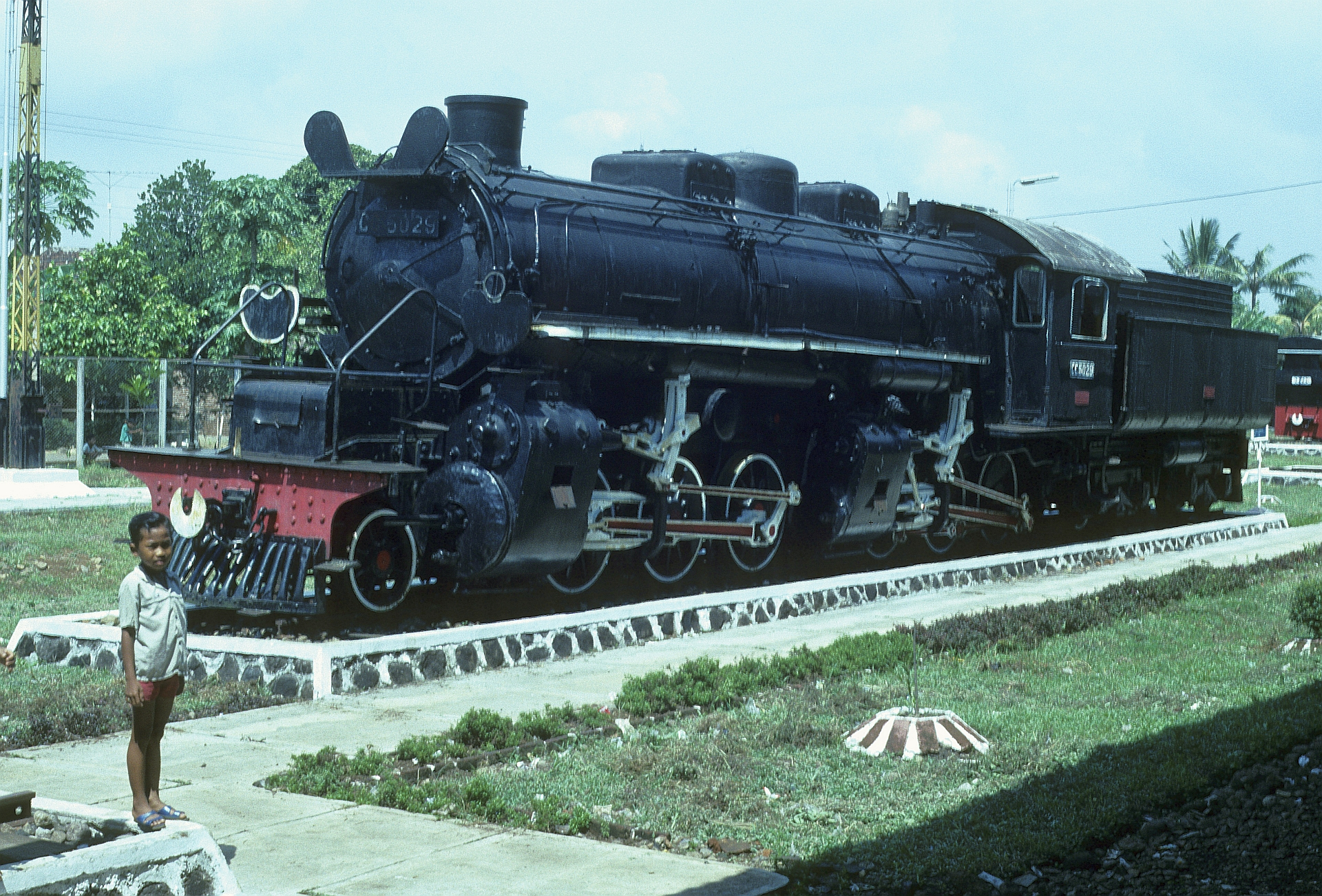
DKA CC50 29 at Ambarawa Railway Museum

The steam era in Indonesia ended in the early 1980s. The remaining locomotives were dumped in station sheds. The last CC50 retired in 1984 after the closure of Cibatu-Garut line.

In 1981, CC50 22 from Purwokerto depot was donated by the Indonesian government to the Railway Museum (Netherlands), as a symbol of friendship between Indonesia and the Netherlands. This locomotive was returned to its original colonial number 1622. In 2023, only three CC50s remain: 01 and 22 built by Werkspoor and SLM 29. CC50 01 is preserved at the Transportation Museum of Taman Mini Indonesia Indah, CC50 22 at Netherlands Railway Museum and CC50 29 at Ambarawa Railway Museum.

=== New Zealand ===
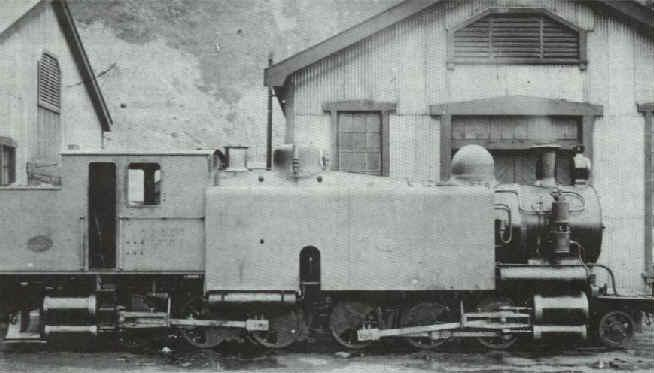
NZR E class 2-6-6-0T Mallet

The sole NZR E class locomotive of 1906 was the only 2-6-6-0T locomotive ever built for and used by the New Zealand Railways Department. It was built at the Petone Workshops in Wellington and was designed for use on the world famous Rimutaka Incline. Numbered 66, making it E 66, it spent the first part of its working life in the Wellington region hauling trains up and down the Rimutaka Incline. It was eventually transferred to the Wellington-Johnsonville section for banking duties, even though it was not designed for that type of work. In 1917, E 66 was withdrawn from service and scrapped. It did not survive long enough for preservation.

=== Spain ===
The Central De Aragón Railway had a few overweight 0-6-6-0T locomotives converged into tender engines of this wheel arrangement in the 1910s, none were preserved.

=== South Africa ===
The South African Railways (SAR) operated 57 Mallet locomotives with this wheel arrangement, spread over six classes, all of them 3 ft 6 in (1,067 mm) Cape gauge.

- In 1909, the Natal Government Railways (NGR) placed a single experimental 2-6-6-0 Mallet articulated compound steam locomotive in service. Built by the American Locomotive Company (ALCO), this was the first Mallet type compound steam locomotive to enter service in South Africa. The locomotive had Walschaerts valve gear, a bar frame and used saturated steam. At the time it was the most powerful locomotive in the country. In 1912, when it was assimilated into the SAR, it was designated Class MA.

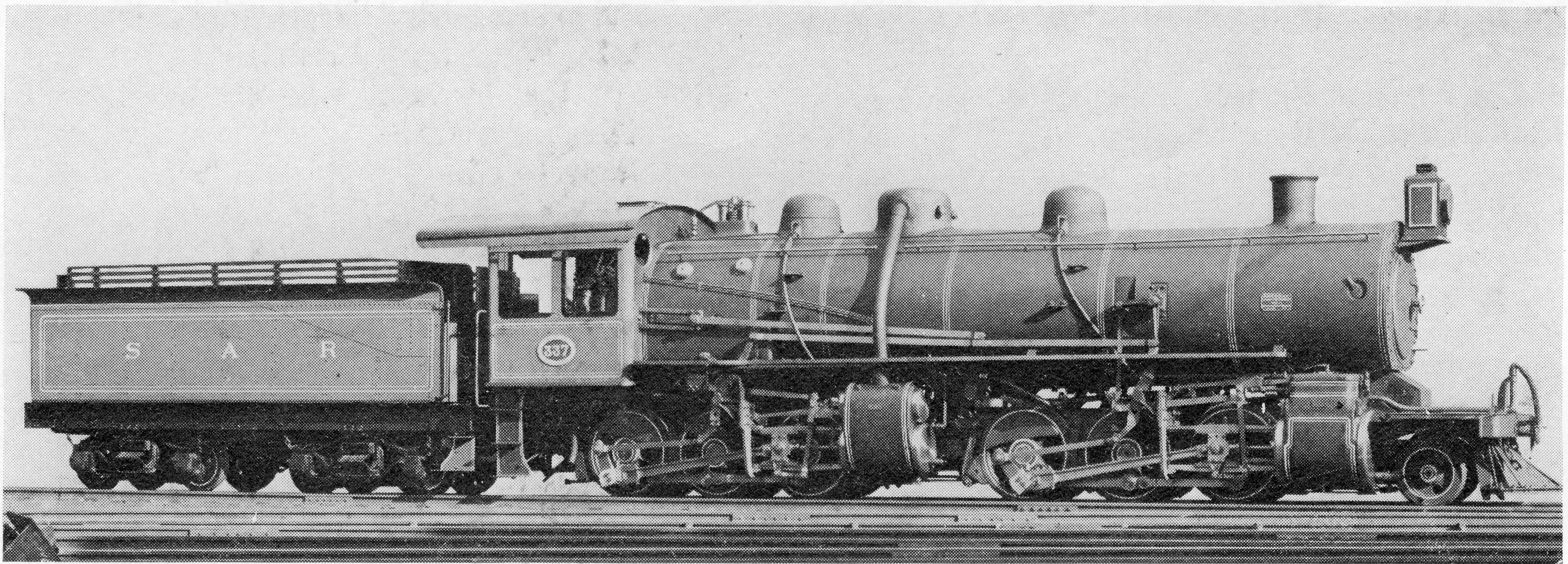
SAR Class MB Mallet

- In 1910, following on the satisfactory performance of the experimental Mallet, the NGR placed five more in service, also built by ALCO. These five differed little from the previous Mallet, basically only in respect of larger boilers which made them slightly heavier and tenders with a larger coal capacity. In 1912, when they were assimilated into the SAR, they were designated Class MB.
- In 1912, the SAR placed ten Class MC Mallets in service. Built by the North British Locomotive Company (NBL), these also had Walschaerts valve gear and used saturated steam. Their Type TM tenders were the same as those of the SAR's Class 3 4-8-2, but they differed little from the previous Mallets in size, power and performance. Two of them were equipped with superheaters at a later date, but no others were modified in this manner.

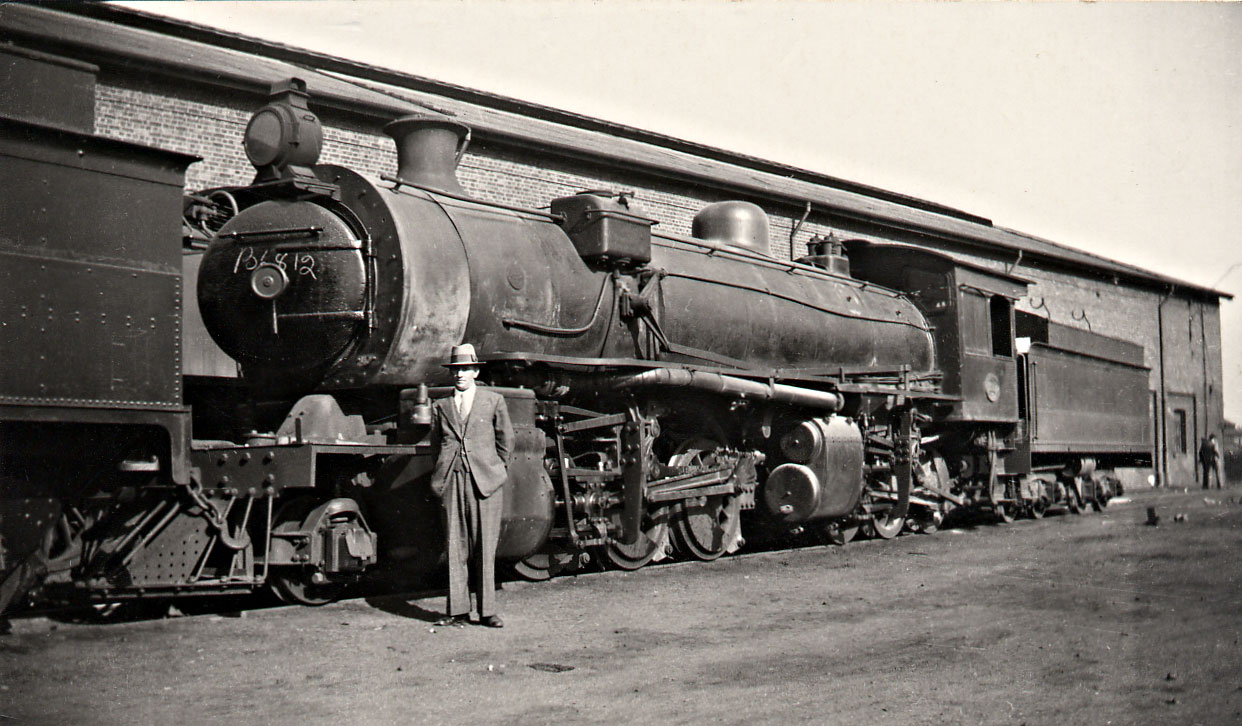
SAR Class MC1 Mallet

- In 1914, the SAR placed fifteen Class MC1 Mallets in service. Ordered from NBL in 1913, they were an improved version of the Class MC with a redesigned boiler which included a superheater, and with 0.5 inches (12.7 millimetres) larger diameter low pressure and high pressure cylinders. The result was a much better performing locomotive with an increased tractive effort.
- Between 1914 and 1921, the SAR placed eighteen Class MJ Mallets in branchline service. Designed by D.A. Hendrie, Chief Mechanical Engineer (CME) of the SAR from 1910 to 1922, they were superheated and had Walschaerts valve gear and Belpaire fireboxes. Ten were ordered from Maffei but, as a result of the outbreak of the First World War, only two could be delivered from Germany in 1914. The order for the remaining eight was then transferred to NBL, who delivered them in 1917. After the cessation of hostilities, Maffei requested that the already built balance of the original order also be accepted. These eight locomotives were delivered in 1921.

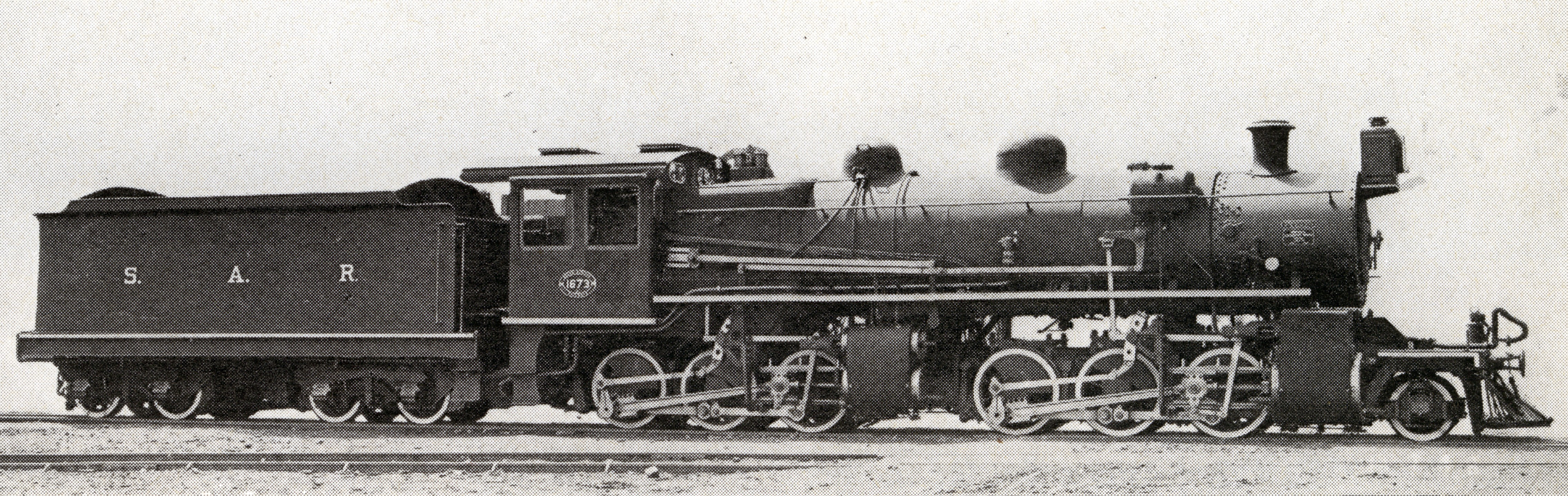
SAR Class MJ1 Mallet

- In 1918, the SAR placed eight Class MJ1 Mallets in branchline service. Because of the disruption of British and German locomotive builders during the First World War, they were ordered from Montreal Locomotive Works (MLW) in Canada. The locomotive design was by MLW, based on the specifications for the Class MJ Mallet. Like the Class MJ, they were superheated, with Walschaerts valve gear and Belpaire fireboxes, but with slightly larger boilers and with the sandbox mounted on the boiler in North American style. The Class MJ1 was the last Mallet type to be placed in service by the SAR and all its subsequent new articulated locomotives were to be Garratts and Modified Fairlies.

=== United States ===
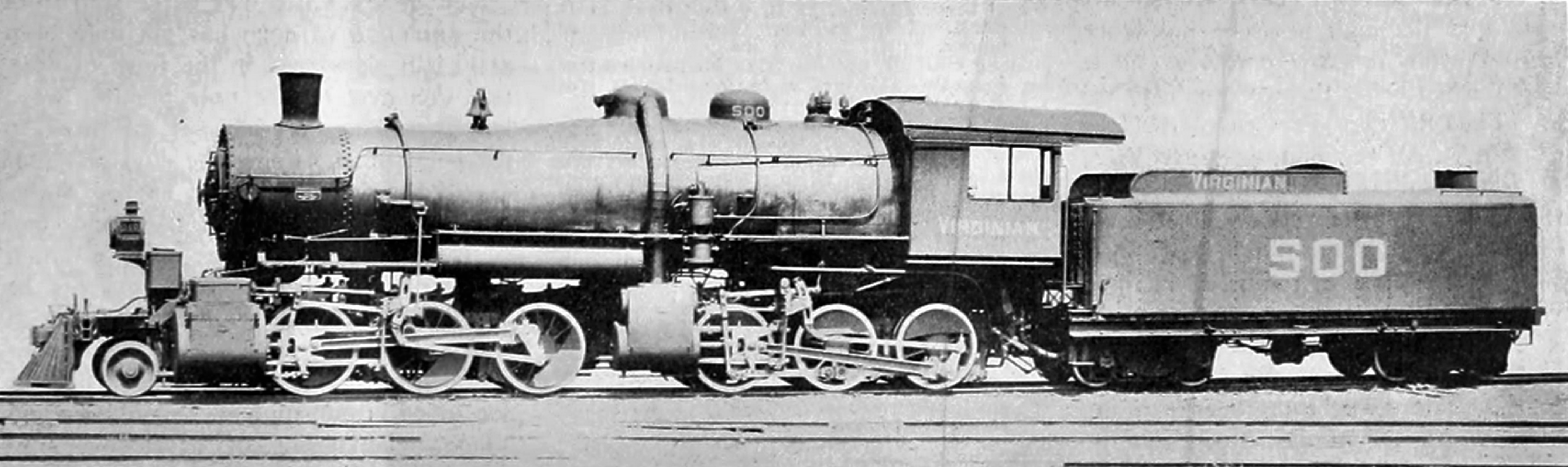
Virginian Railway Class AA Mallet

At least two American railroads used 2-6-6-0 Mallet locomotives. One was the Denver, Northwestern and Pacific Railway, which later became the Denver and Salt Lake Railroad and eventually the Denver and Salt Lake Railway. Towards the end of their service life, after the acquisition of the Denver and Salt Lake, these locomotives were used by the Denver and Rio Grande Western Railroad (D&RGW). The locomotives were initially used across the Rollins Pass and later on the Moffat Tunnel route of the Denver and Salt Lake. All were scrapped by the D&RGW between 1947 and 1952.

Another was the Virginian Railway, whose Class AA 2-6-6-0 is depicted.
