= South African type TL tender =

Steam locomotive tender in South Africa

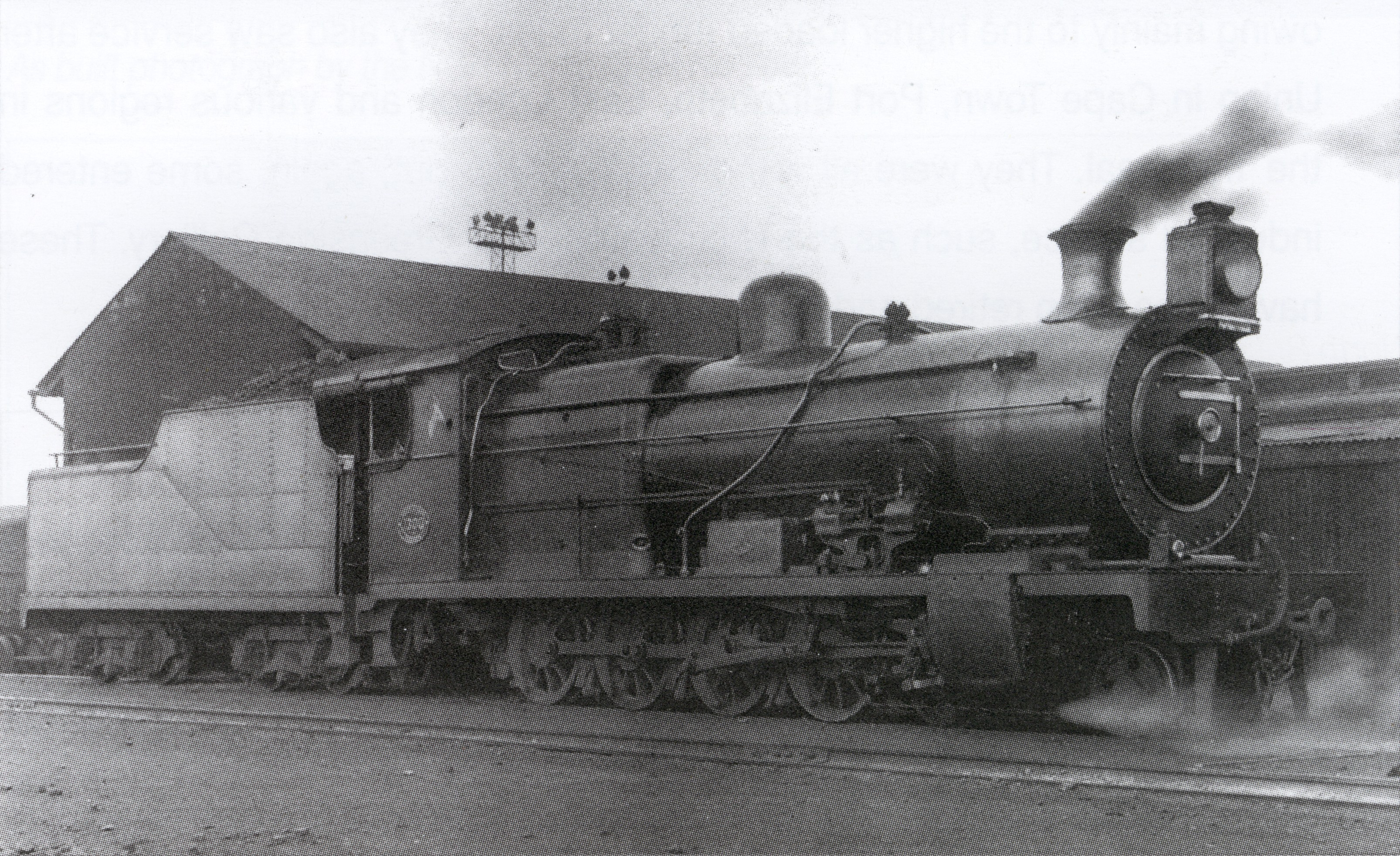
- Type TL tender on SAR Class 1A
Type and origin
- ♠ Tenders no. 1446-1475, 1479-1488 ♥ Tenders no. 765-766, 1289-1309
- Locomotive: SAR Classes 1A, 2C, 3 & 3B
- Designer: South African Railways
- Builder: South African Railways
- In service: c. 1925
- Rebuilt from: Type TJ, Type TM
Specifications
- Configuration: 2-axle bogies
- Gauge: 3 ft 6 in (1,067 mm) Cape gauge
- Length: ♠ 24 ft 2 5/8 in (7,382 mm) ♥ 24 ft 2 7/8 in (7,388 mm)
- Wheel dia.: 30 in (762 mm)
- Wheelbase: 16 ft 6 in (5,029 mm)
  - Bogie: 4 ft 6 in (1,372 mm)
- Fuel type: Coal
- Fuel cap.: 8 LT 15 cwt (8.9 t) as rebuilt 11 LT 15 cwt (11.9 t) modified
- Water cap.: 3,900 imp gal (17,700 L)
- Stoking: Manual
- Couplers: Drawbar & Johnston link-and-pin Drawbar & AAR knuckle (1930s)
Career
- Operators: South African Railways
- Numbers: SAR 765-766, 1289-1309, 1446-1475, 1479-1488

The South African type TL tender was a steam locomotive tender.

Type TL tenders were rebuilt from Type TJ and Type TM tenders which had entered service between 1909 and 1912. The rebuilding resulted in a tender with a larger coal bunker.

== Origin ==
Type TJ tenders entered service on the Natal Government Railways (NGR) in 1909 and 1910, as tenders to the first five locomotives of the Class B 4-8-2 of 1909 and the Classes A 4-6-0 and B 4-8-0 of 1910.

Type TM tenders entered service on the NGR and South African Railways (SAR) in 1911 and 1912, as tenders to the last 25 locomotives of the NGR Class B 4-8-2 and the SAR Class 3B.

These locomotives and tender were designed by NGR Locomotive Superintendent D.A. Hendrie and built by the North British Locomotive Company and the NGR.

== Rebuilding ==
From c. 1925, several of the Types TJ and TM tenders were completely rebuilt by the South African Railways (SAR) by mounting a new upper structure on the existing underframe. These rebuilt tenders had a more modern appearance, with flush sides all the way to the top of the coal bunker. They were designated Type TL.

The program to rebuild several older tender types with new upper structures was begun by Colonel F.R. Collins DSO, who approved several of the detailed drawings for the work during his term in office as Chief Mechanical Engineer (CME) of the SAR from 1922 to 1929. It was continued by his successor, A.G. Watson.

== Characteristics ==
In the case of tenders rebuilt from the Type TJ, the rebuilding resulted in a tender with larger water tanks, with the capacity increased from 3,500 to 3,900 imperial gallons (15,900 to 17,700 litres), and a larger coal capacity, increased from 6 long tons (6.1 tonnes) to 8 long tons 15 hundredweight (8.9 tonnes).

In the case of tenders rebuilt from the Type TM, the water capacity was reduced from 4,000 to 3,900 imperial gallons (18,200 to 17,700 litres), while the coal capacity was increased from 8 long tons 5 hundredweight (8.4 tonnes) to 8 long tons 15 hundredweight (8.9 tonnes).

== Classification letters ==
Since many tender types are interchangeable between different locomotive classes and types, a tender classification system was adopted by the SAR. The first letter of the tender type indicates the classes of engines to which it could be coupled. The "T_" tenders could be used with the locomotive classes as shown, although the engine drawbar had to be replaced to suit the target engine in some cases.

- NGR Class B 4-8-0 of 1910, SAR Class 1A.
- NGR Class A 4-6-2 of 1910, SAR Class 2C.
- NGR Class B 4-8-2 of 1909, SAR Class 3.
- SAR Class 3B.
- SAR Class MC.

The second letter indicates the tender's water capacity. The "_L" tenders had a capacity of 3,900 imperial gallons (17,700 litres; 4,680 US gallons).

== Modification ==
Some Type TL tenders were subsequently modified to increase their coal capacity from 8 long tons 15 hundredweight (8.9 tonnes) to 11 long tons 15 hundredweight (11.9 tonnes), by extending the top of the coal bunker rearwards.

== Illustration ==
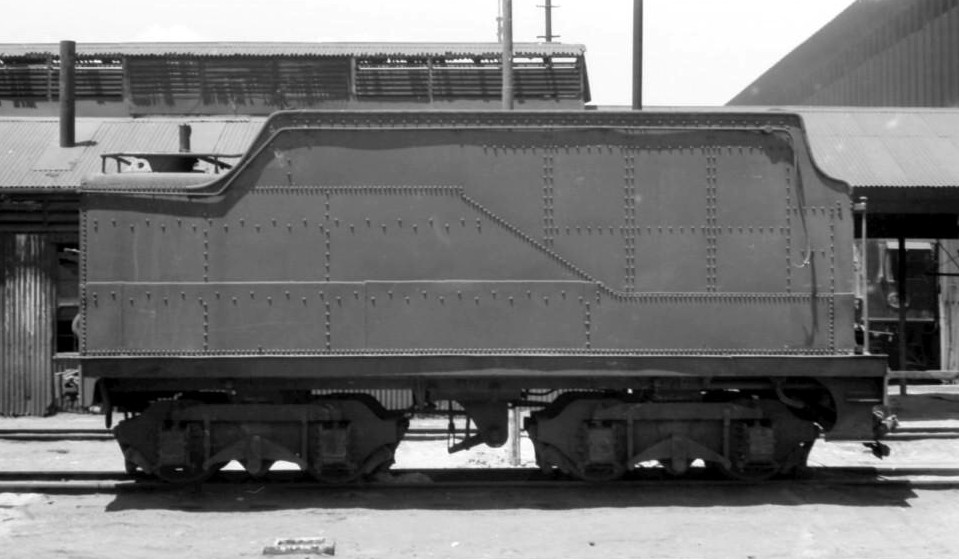
Modified Type TL tender with larger coal capacity
