= South African type TJ tender =

Steam locomotive introduced in 1909

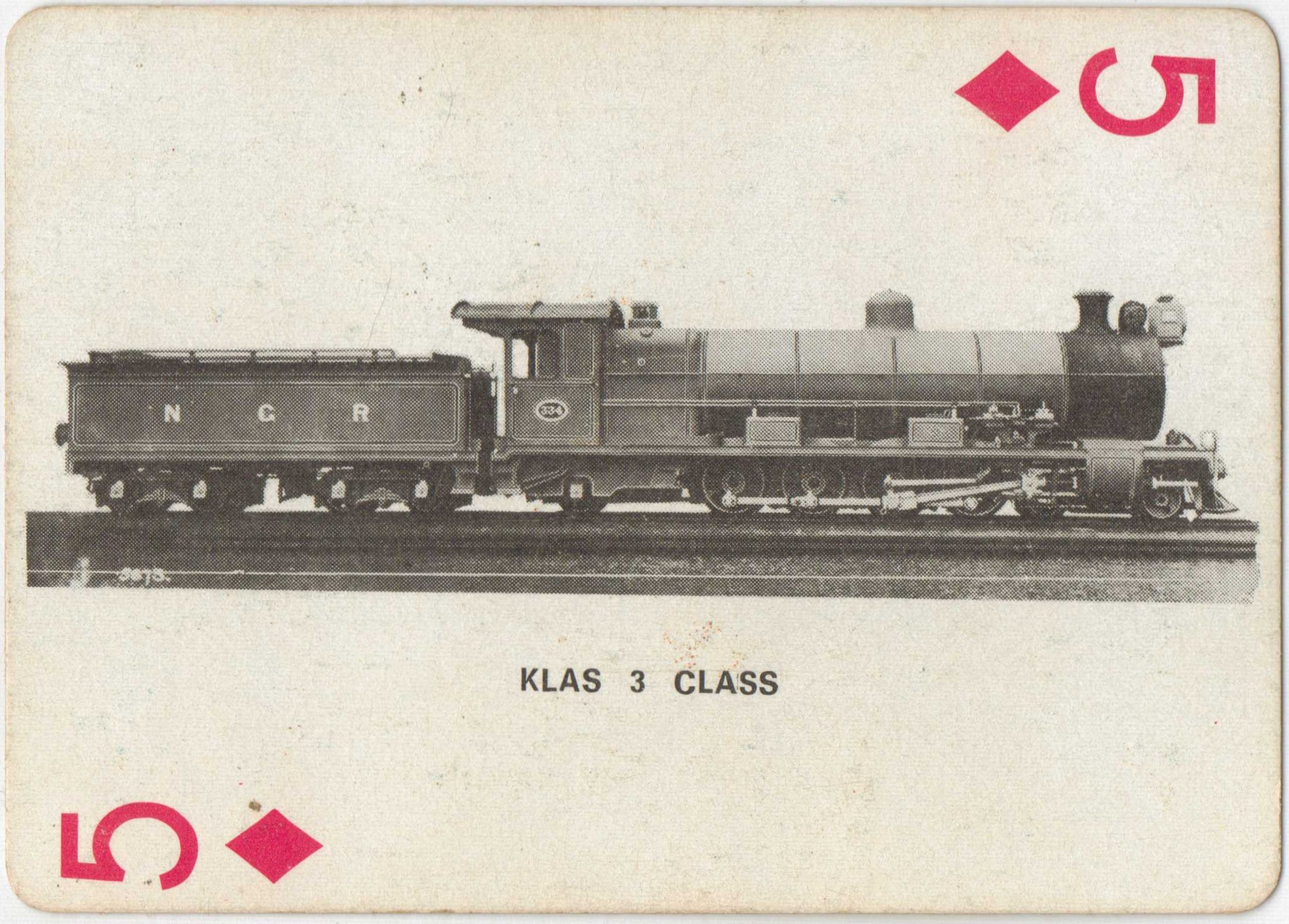
- Type TJ tender on NGR Class B of 1909
Type and origin
- ♠ NGR Class B of 1909 ♥ NGR Classes A & B of 1910
- Locomotive: NGR Class A of 1910; NGR Class B of 1909; NGR Class B of 1910
- Designer: Natal Government Railways (D.A. Hendrie)
- Builder: Natal Government Railways; North British Locomotive Company
- In service: 1909-1910
- Rebuilder: South African Railways
- Rebuild date: c. 1925
- Rebuilt to: Type TL
Specifications
- Configuration: 2-axle bogies
- Gauge: 3 ft 6 in (1,067 mm) Cape gauge
- Length: ♠ 24 ft 2 7/8 in (7,388 mm) ♥ 24 ft 2 5/8 in (7,382 mm)
- Wheel dia.: 30 in (762 mm)
- Wheelbase: 16 ft 6 in (5,029 mm)
  - Bogie: 4 ft 6 in (1,372 mm)
- Axle load: 10 LT 5 cwt (10,410 kg)
  - Front bogie: 20 LT 1 cwt (20,370 kg)
  - Rear bogie: 20 LT 10 cwt (20,830 kg)
- Weight empty: 42,392 lb (19,229 kg)
- Weight w/o: 40 LT 11 cwt (41,200 kg)
- Fuel type: Coal
- Fuel cap.: 6 LT (6.1 t)
- Water cap.: 3,500 imp gal (15,900 L)
- Stoking: Manual
- Couplers: Drawbar & Johnston link-and-pin Drawbar & AAR knuckle (1930s)
Career
- Operators: Natal Government Railways; South African Railways
- Numbers: SAR 765-766, 1289-1309, 1446-1450

The South African type TJ tender was a steam locomotive tender from the pre-Union era in the Natal Colony.

The Type TJ tender first entered service in 1909, as tenders to the first five Class B 4-8-2 Mountain type steam locomotives which were acquired by the Natal Government Railways in that year. These locomotives were designated Class 3 on the South African Railways in 1912.

== Manufacturers ==
Type TJ tenders were built in 1909 and 1910 by the North British Locomotive Company (NBL) and the Natal Government Railways (NGR).

The NGR placed its first five Class B Mountain type locomotives in service in 1909. The locomotive and tender were designed by NGR Locomotive Superintendent D.A. Hendrie and built by NBL. Known as the Hendrie D, but officially designated Class B on the NGR, it was the first true Mountain type locomotive in the world. The Type TJ first entered service as tenders to these five locomotives. More entered service the following year, as tenders to the 21 NGR Class B Mastodon type locomotives of 1910, known as the Improved Hendrie B, and two NGR Class A Pacific type Hendrie A locomotives which were built in the Durban workshops of the NGR.

Another 25 Class B Mountain type locomotives entered service on the NGR in 1911, but these were delivered with Type TM tenders which had a larger coal and water capacity.

== Characteristics ==
The tender had a coal capacity of 6 long tons (6.1 tonnes), a water capacity of 3,500 imperial gallons (15,900 litres) and a maximum axle load of 10 long tons 5 hundredweight (10,410 kilograms).

== Locomotives ==
In the South African Railways (SAR) years, tenders were numbered for the engines they were delivered with. In most cases, an oval number plate, bearing the engine number and often also the tender type, would be attached to the rear end of the tender. During the classification and renumbering of locomotives onto the SAR roster in 1912, no separate classification and renumbering list was published for tenders, which should have been renumbered according to the locomotive renumbering list.

In 1912, the SAR grouped and renumbered these NGR Classes A and B locomotives into three separate classes, according to wheel arrangement. Only these three classes were delivered new with Type TJ tenders. Bearing in mind that tenders could and did migrate between engines, the Type TJ tenders should have been numbered in the number ranges as shown.

- 1909: NGR Class B 4-8-2 of 1909, SAR Class 3, numbers 1446 to 1450.
- 1910: NGR Class B 4-8-0 of 1910, SAR Class 1A, numbers 1289 to 1309.
- 1910: NGR Class A 4-6-2 of 1910, SAR Class 2C, numbers 765 and 766.

== Classification letters ==
Since many tender types are interchangeable between different locomotive classes and types, a tender classification system was adopted by the SAR. The first letter of the tender type indicates the classes of engines to which it could be coupled. The "T_" tenders could be used with the locomotive classes as shown, although engine drawbars and intermediate emergency chains had to be replaced or adjusted to suit the target locomotive in some cases.

- NGR Class B 4-8-0 of 1910, SAR Class 1A.
- NGR Class A 4-6-2 of 1910, SAR Class 2C.
- NGR Class B 4-8-2 of 1909, SAR Class 3.
- SAR Class 3B.
- SAR Class MC.

The second letter indicates the tender's water capacity. The "_J" tenders had a capacity of 3,500 imperial gallons (15,900 litres; 4,200 US gallons).

== Modifications and rebuilding ==
=== Modifications ===
Builder's works pictures of most of these locomotives show them with the original slatted upper sides on the tender. Pictures of most of these locomotives in service, however, show them with a Type TJ tender with built-up sheet-metal sides to the coal bunker.

=== Rebuilding to Type TL ===
From c. 1925, several of the Type TJ tenders were completely rebuilt by the SAR by mounting a new upper structure on the existing underframe, with larger water tanks and a larger coal capacity. These rebuilt tenders had a more modern appearance, with flush sides all the way to the top of the coal bunker. They were designated Type TL.

The program to rebuild several older tender types with new upper structures was begun by Col F.R. Collins DSO, who approved several of the detailed drawings for the work during his term in office as Chief Mechanical Engineer of the SAR from 1922 to 1929. It was continued by his successor, A.G. Watson.

== Illustration ==
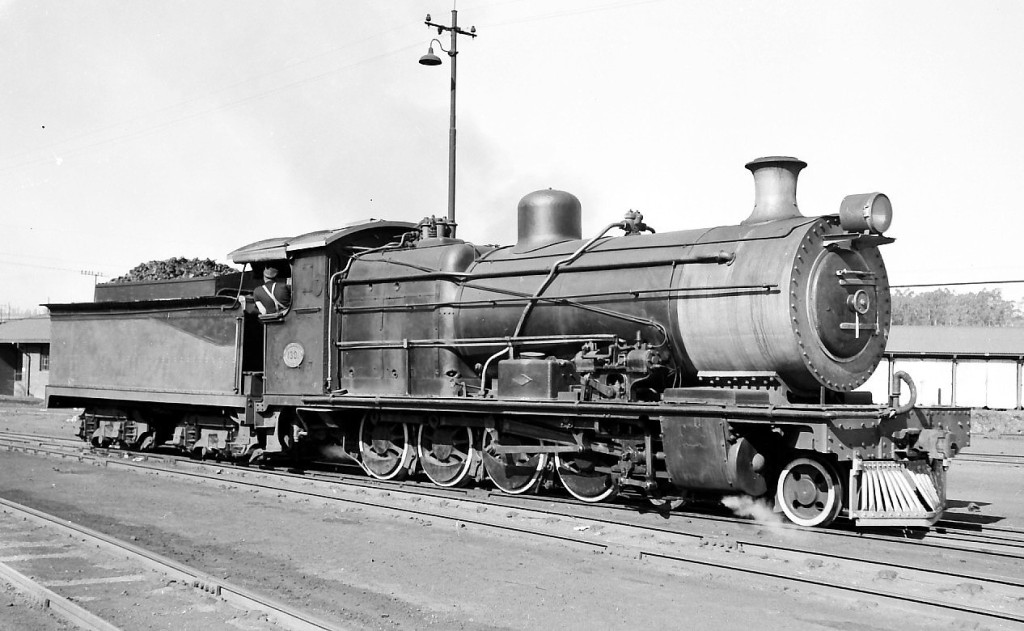
Modified Type TJ with sheet-metal top on SAR Class 1A, 1962

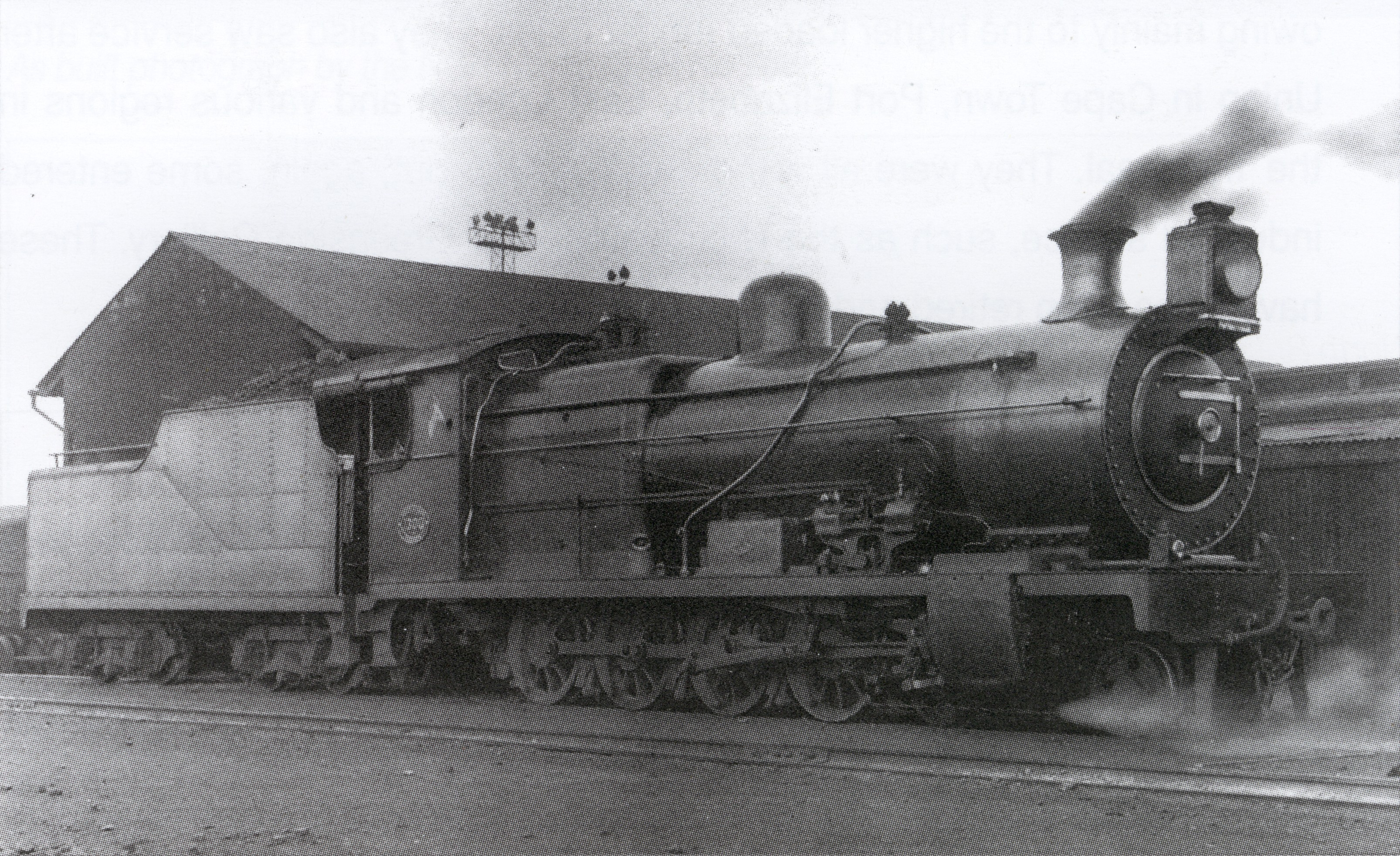
Type TL, rebuilt from Type TJ, on SAR Class 1A, c. 1930
