= Natal Government Railways Class B locomotives =

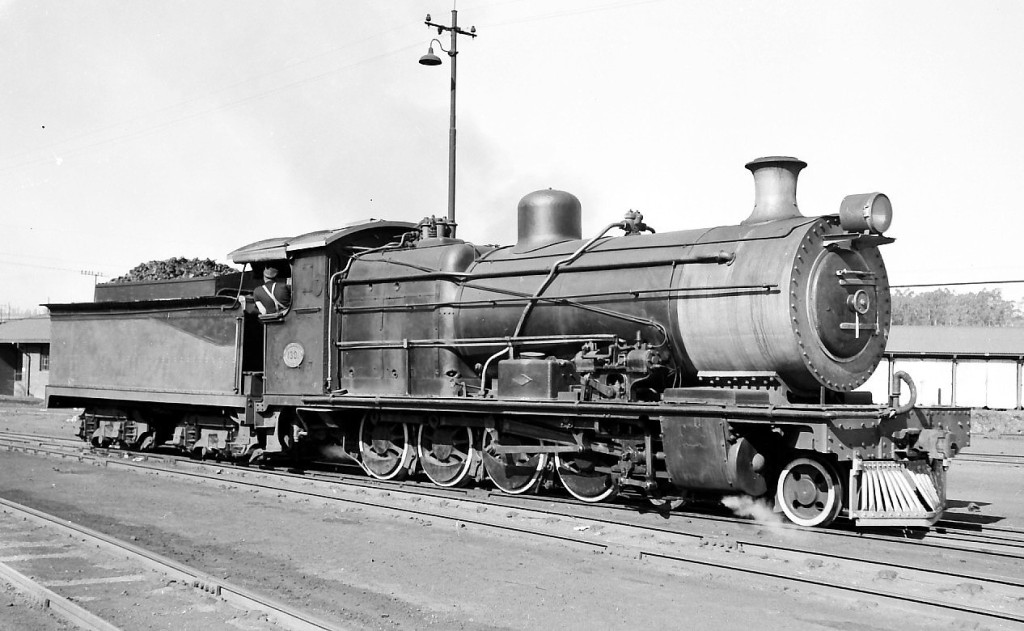
NGR Class B 4-8-0 of 1910

The Natal Government Railways Class B locomotives include five locomotive types, all designated Class B irrespective of differences in wheel arrangement.

When the Union of South Africa was established on 31 May 1910, the three Colonial government railways (Cape Government Railways, Natal Government Railways and Central South African Railways) were united under a single administration to control and administer the railways, ports and harbours of the Union. In 1912, the NGR Class B locomotives were reclassified into five separate classes on the South African Railways.

4-8-0 wheel arrangement

- NGR Class B 4-8-0 1904 (SAR Class 1)
- NGR Class B 4-8-0 1910 (SAR Class 1A)

4-8-2 wheel arrangement

- NGR Class B 4-8-2 1906 (SAR Class 1B)
- NGR Class B 4-8-2 1909 (SAR Class 3)
- NGR Class B 4-8-2 1910 (SAR Class 3A)
