= South African Class MC 2-6-6-0 =

1912 articulated steam locomotive

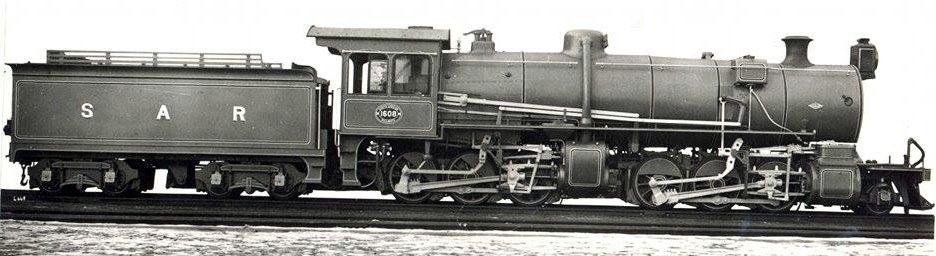
- SAR Class MC no. 1608, c. 1912
Type and origin
- Power type: Steam
- Designer: North British Locomotive Company
- Builder: North British Locomotive Company
- Serial number: 19577-19586
- Model: NGR Mallet
- Build date: 1912
- Total produced: 10
Specifications
- Configuration
  - Whyte: 2-6-6-0 (Denver)
  - UIC: (1'C)Cnv4 as built (1'C)Chv4 (no. 1612 & 1615)
- Driver: 3rd & 6th coupled axles
- Gauge: 3 ft 6 in (1,067 mm) Cape gauge
- Leading dia.: 28 1/2 in (724 mm)
- Coupled dia.: 45 1/2 in (1,156 mm)
- Tender wheels: 30 in (762 mm)
- Wheelbase: 59 ft 3 in (18,059 mm)
  - Engine: 33 ft 5 in (10,185 mm)
  - Coupled: 8 ft 4 in (2,540 mm) per unit
  - Tender: 16 ft 6 in (5,029 mm)
  - Tender bogie: 4 ft 6 in (1,372 mm)
- Length
  - Over couplers: 66 ft 9 3/4 in (20,364 mm)
- Height: 12 ft 5 3/16 in (3,789 mm)
- Axle load: 14 LT 13 cwt (14,890 kg)
  - Leading: 8 LT 15 cwt (8,890 kg)
  - 1st coupled: 14 LT 5 cwt (14,480 kg)
  - 2nd coupled: 14 LT 5 cwt (14,480 kg)
  - 3rd coupled: 14 LT 7 cwt (14,580 kg)
  - 4th coupled: 14 LT 10 cwt (14,730 kg)
  - 5th coupled: 14 LT 11 cwt (14,780 kg)
  - 6th coupled: 14 LT 13 cwt (14,890 kg)
  - Tender bogie: Bogie 1: 21 LT 14 cwt (22,050 kg); Bogie 2: 21 LT 16 cwt (22,150 kg)
  - Tender axle: 10 LT 18 cwt (11,070 kg)
- Adhesive weight: 86 LT 11 cwt (87,940 kg)
- Loco weight: 95 LT 6 cwt (96,830 kg)
- Tender weight: 43 LT 10 cwt (44,200 kg)
- Total weight: 138 LT 16 cwt (141,000 kg)
- Tender type: TM (2-axle bogies)
- Fuel type: Coal
- Fuel capacity: 8 LT 5 cwt (8.4 t)
- Water cap.: 4,000 imp gal (18,200 L)
- Firebox
  - Type: Round-top
  - Grate area: 42.5 sq ft (3.95 m^{2})
- Boiler
  - Pitch: 7 ft 6 in (2,286 mm)
  - Diameter: 5 ft 8 in (1,727 mm)
  - Tube plates: 16 ft 2 3/4 in (4,947 mm)
  - Small tubes: 258: 2 1/4 in (57 mm)
- Boiler pressure: 200 psi (1,379 kPa)
- Safety valve: Ramsbottom
- Heating surface
  - Firebox: 154 sq ft (14.3 m^{2})
  - Tubes: 2,462 sq ft (228.7 m^{2})
  - Total surface: 2,616 sq ft (243.0 m^{2})
- Cylinders: Four
- High-pressure cylinder: 17 1/2 in (444 mm) bore 26 in (660 mm) stroke
- Low-pressure cylinder: 28 in (711 mm) bore 26 in (660 mm) stroke
- Valve gear: Walschaerts
- Valve type: HP Piston, LP Slide
- Couplers: Johnston link-and-pin
Performance figures
- Tractive effort: 44,810 lbf (199.3 kN) @ 50%
Career
- Operators: South African Railways
- Class: Class MC
- Number in class: 10
- Numbers: 1607–1616
- Delivered: 1912
- First run: 1912
- Withdrawn: 1933

The South African Railways Class MC 2-6-6-0 of 1912 was a steam locomotive.

In 1912, the South African Railways placed ten Class MC Mallet articulated compound steam locomotives with a 2-6-6-0 wheel arrangement in service in Natal.

== Manufacturer ==
To augment the Mallet locomotive fleet operating across the more difficult sections of the Natal mainline, the South African Railways (SAR) placed an order with the North British Locomotive Company for ten compound steam locomotives which were very similar to the Class MB. They were delivered and placed in service in May 1912, designated Class MC and numbered in the range from 1607 to 1616.

== Compounding ==
In a compound locomotive, steam is expanded in phases. After being expanded in a high-pressure cylinder and having then lost pressure and given up part of its heat, it is exhausted into a larger-volume low-pressure cylinder for secondary expansion, after which it is exhausted through the smokebox.

In the compound Mallet locomotive, the rear set of coupled wheels are driven by the smaller high-pressure cylinders, which are fed steam from the steam dome. Their spent steam is then fed to the larger low-pressure cylinders which drive the front set of coupled wheels. By comparison, in the more usual arrangement of simple expansion steam is expanded just once in any one cylinder before being exhausted through the smokebox.

== Characteristics ==
Like the previous Mallets, these ten compound locomotives had Walschaerts valve gear and used saturated steam. The high-pressure cylinders of the hind engine unit were equipped with piston valves while the low-pressure cylinders of the front engine unit were equipped with slide valves.

Their Type TM tenders were the same as those of the Classes 3 and 3B, with a coal capacity of 8 long tons 5 hundredweight (8.4 tonnes) and a water capacity of 4,000 imperial gallons (18,200 litres). The locomotives differed little from the previous Mallets in size, power and performance and may for all intents and purposes also have been classified as Class MB. It would seem that, compared to the Cape Government Railways which tended to group locomotives in the same Class which were dissimilar even to the extent of having different wheel arrangements, the early SAR at times took locomotive classification to the other extreme.

Unlike the Class MB on which the sandboxes were placed on top of the boiler in accordance with American practice, the sandboxes of the Class MC were arranged on a different system, the advantages of which were questionable. The sandboxes for the hind engine unit were secured to the running board just to the rear of the high-pressure cylinders, while those for the front engine unit were placed on the upper sides of the boiler just to the rear of the smokebox.

== Superheating ==
The Class MC were satisfactory locomotives but like the earlier Mallet compounds, they would have performed better if they had been superheated. Two of them, numbers 1612 and 1615, were later equipped with new boilers with superheaters and their coupled wheels were retyred to a diameter of 46 inches (1,168 millimetres). No others were modified in this manner.

== Service ==
The Class MC joined the Class MA and MB fleet on the Natal mainline, working heavy coal trains between Estcourt and Highlands. In later years, some were transferred to the Cape Western System where they served into the 1930s as banking locomotives up the Hex River Railpass between De Doorns and Touws River. Others were transferred to the Witwatersrand for general service and to haul coal on the Witbank-Germiston line. They were withdrawn from service during 1933.
