= South African Class 1A 4-8-0 =

1910 design of steam locomotive

NGR Class B 4-8-0 1910 South African Class 1A 4-8-0
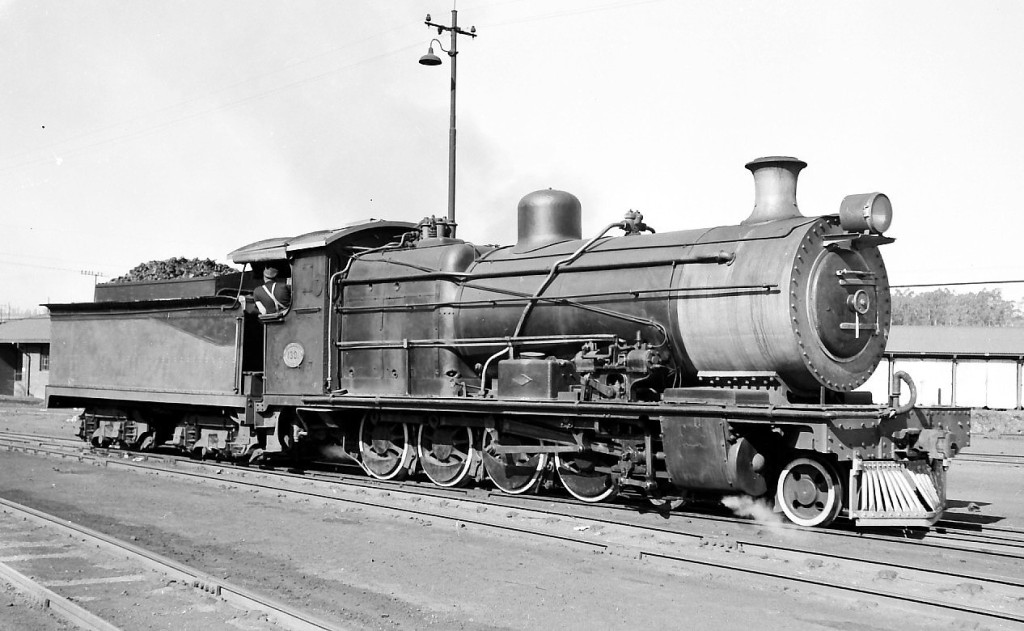
- SAR Class 1A no. 1301, ex NGR Class B no. 25, Mason's Mill Loco, 6 July 1962
Type and origin
- Power type: Steam
- Designer: Natal Government Railways (D.A. Hendrie)
- Builder: North British Locomotive Company
- Serial number: 19051-19071
- Model: NGR Hendrie B
- Build date: 1910
- Total produced: 21
Specifications
- Configuration
  - Whyte: 4-8-0 (Mastodon)
  - UIC: 2'Dn2
- Driver: 2nd coupled axle
- Gauge: 3 ft 6 in (1,067 mm) Cape gauge
- Leading dia.: 28 1/2 in (724 mm)
- Coupled dia.: 46 in (1,168 mm)
- Tender wheels: 30 in (762 mm)
- Wheelbase: 50 ft 3 1/4 in (15,323 mm)
  - Engine: 22 ft 6 in (6,858 mm)
  - Leading: 6 ft (1,829 mm)
  - Coupled: 12 ft 9 in (3,886 mm)
  - Tender: 16 ft 6 in (5,029 mm)
  - Tender bogie: 4 ft 6 in (1,372 mm)
- Length
  - Over couplers: 57 ft 10 in (17,628 mm)
- Height: 12 ft 7 1/4 in (3,842 mm)
- Frame type: Plate
- Axle load: 14 LT 11 cwt (14,780 kg)
  - Leading: 13 LT 12 cwt (13,820 kg)
  - 1st coupled: 14 LT 7 cwt (14,580 kg)
  - 2nd coupled: 14 LT 11 cwt (14,780 kg)
  - 3rd coupled: 13 LT 17 cwt (14,070 kg)
  - 4th coupled: 14 LT 6 cwt (14,530 kg)
  - Tender bogie: Bogie 1: 20 LT 1 cwt (20,370 kg); Bogie 2: 20 LT 10 cwt (20,830 kg)
  - Tender axle: 10 LT 5 cwt (10,410 kg)
- Adhesive weight: 57 LT 1 cwt (57,970 kg)
- Loco weight: 70 LT 13 cwt (71,780 kg)
- Tender weight: 40 LT 11 cwt (41,200 kg)
- Total weight: 111 LT 4 cwt (113,000 kg)
- Tender type: TJ (2-axle bogies); TJ, TL, TM permitted
- Fuel type: Coal
- Fuel capacity: 6 LT (6.1 t)
- Water cap.: 3,500 imp gal (15,900 L)
- Firebox
  - Type: Belpaire & combustion chamber
  - Grate area: 34 sq ft (3.2 m^{2})
- Boiler
  - Pitch: 7 ft 4 1/4 in (2,242 mm)
  - Diameter: 5 ft 4 1/2 in (1,638 mm)
  - Tube plates: 12 ft 1 in (3,683 mm)
  - Small tubes: 325: 2 in (51 mm)
- Boiler pressure: 190 psi (1,310 kPa)
- Safety valve: Ramsbottom
- Heating surface
  - Firebox: 132 sq ft (12.3 m^{2})
  - Tubes: 2,056 sq ft (191.0 m^{2})
  - Total surface: 2,188 sq ft (203.3 m^{2})
- Cylinders: Two
- Cylinder size: 20 1/2 in (521 mm) bore 24 in (610 mm) stroke
- Valve gear: Walschaerts
- Valve type: Murdoch's D slide Piston on no. 33
- Couplers: Johnston link-and-pin AAR knuckle (1930s)
Performance figures
- Tractive effort: 31,240 lbf (139.0 kN) @ 75%
Career
- Operators: Natal Government Railways; South African Railways
- Class: NGR Class B SAR Class 1A
- Number in class: 21
- Numbers: NGR 13-33; SAR 1289-1309
- Delivered: 1910
- First run: 1910
- Withdrawn: 1974
- The leading coupled axle had flangeless wheels

The South African Railways Class 1A 4-8-0 of 1910 was a steam locomotive from the pre-Union era in the Colony of Natal.

In 1910, the Natal Government Railways placed 21 improved Class B 4-8-0 Mastodon type tender locomotives in service. In 1912, when these locomotives were assimilated into the South African Railways, they were renumbered and designated Class 1A.

== Manufacturer ==
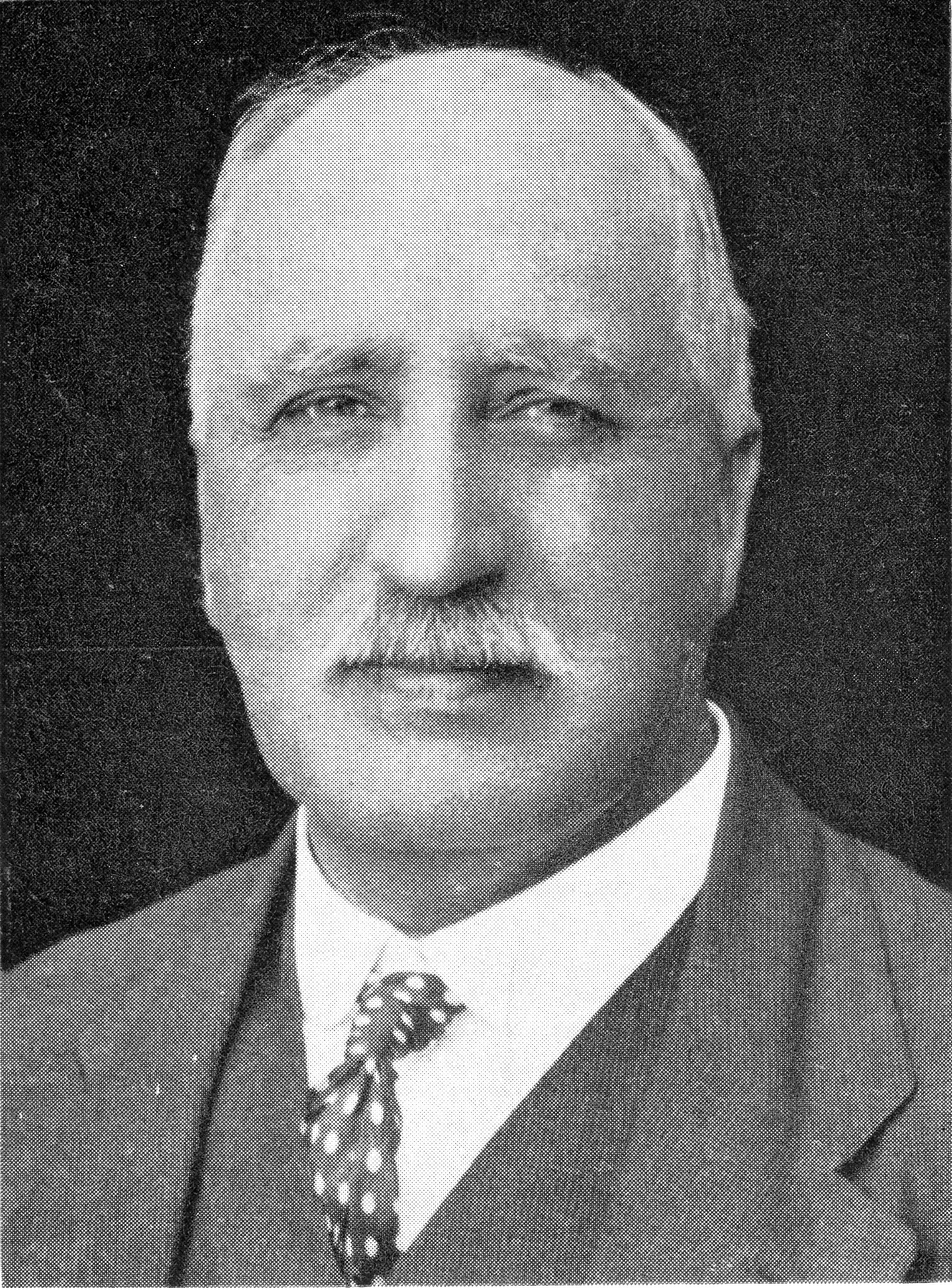
D.A. Hendrie

By 1909, more locomotives were required for goods operation on the lower sections of the Natal mainline and a further 21 locomotives of the Class B 4-8-0 Mastodon design were ordered by the Natal Government Railways (NGR). They were delivered and placed in service in 1910, built by the North British Locomotive Company with Type TJ tenders and numbered in the range from 13 to 33. These locomotives were also officially designated Class B and, since they incorporated various improvements on the locomotives of 1904, they became commonly known as the Class Improved Hendrie B.

== Characteristics ==
Like their predecessors, they had Belpaire fireboxes with combustion chambers and Walschaerts valve gear. While they were practically identical to the 1904 locomotives in most respects, their boilers had been raised by 1 1/4 inches (32 millimetres), which raised the boiler pitch by 1 inch (25 millimetres) to 7 feet 4 1/4 inches (2,242 millimetres) and gave a better rake on the sides of the ash pan.

With one exception, they used Murdoch's D slide valves like the 1904 locomotives. The last locomotive, no. 33, was an experimental locomotive equipped with piston valves.

== Hendrie's steam reverser ==
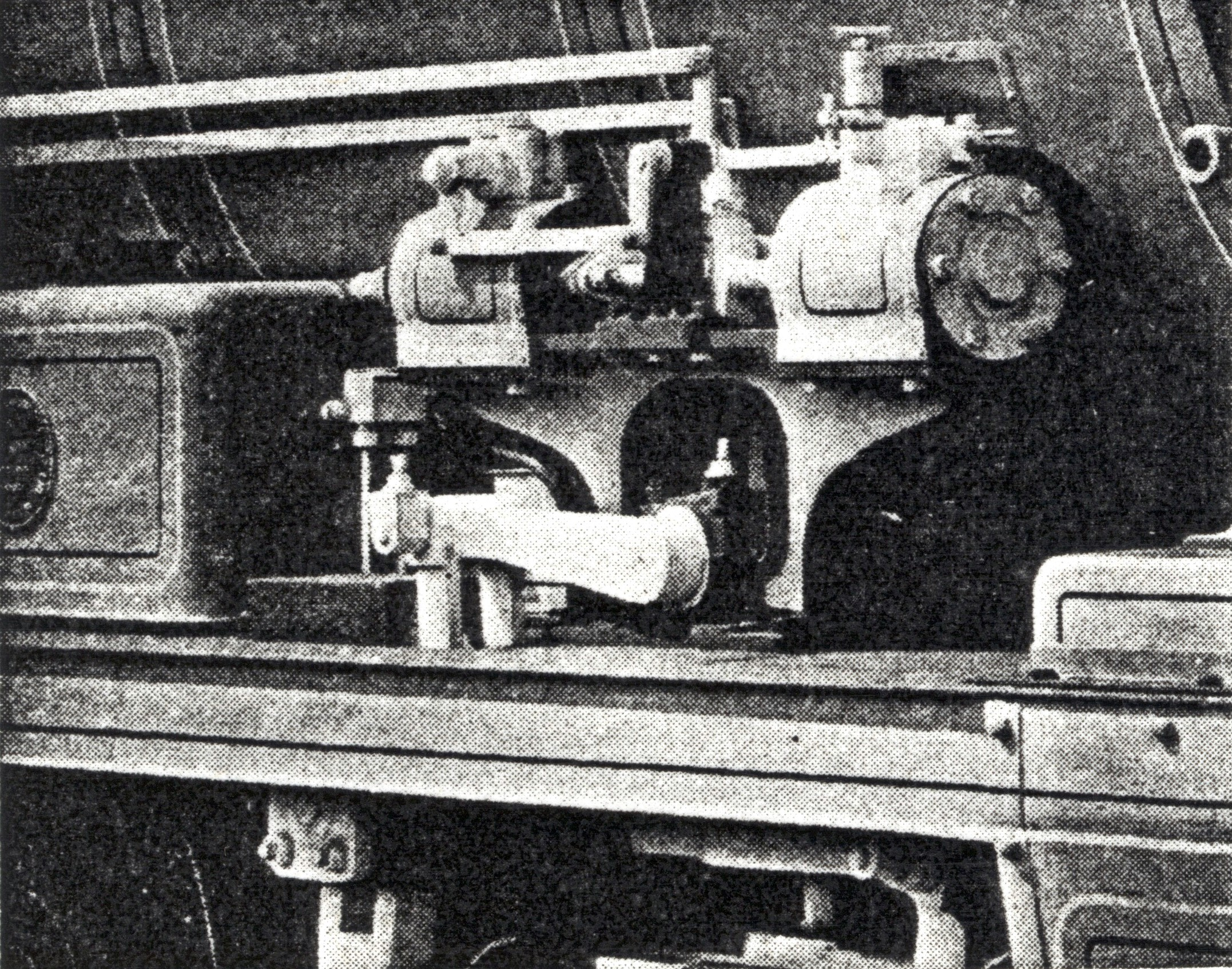
Hendrie's steam reverser

They were built with Hendrie's steam reversers. The Hendrie steam reversing gear consisted of a 5 1/2 inches (140 millimetres) diameter steam cylinder and a 5 inches (127 millimetres) diameter oil cylinder, arranged in line on a bracket which was fixed to the main engine frame on the driver's side. The cylinders had a common piston rod which had a slot in the centre, between the cylinders. This slot accommodated a sliding crosshead which engaged with an arm fixed to the reversing shaft.

By means of a small lever, the driver could admit steam to either end of the steam cylinder, which would open a cataract valve arranged on top of the oil cylinder to allow oil to flow from either end of the oil cylinder to the other. A pointer in the cab would indicate the exact position of the reversing gear and, when the desired position was reached, bringing the hand lever to the central position would close the cataract valve and fix the gear in the forward or reverse position.

== South African Railways ==
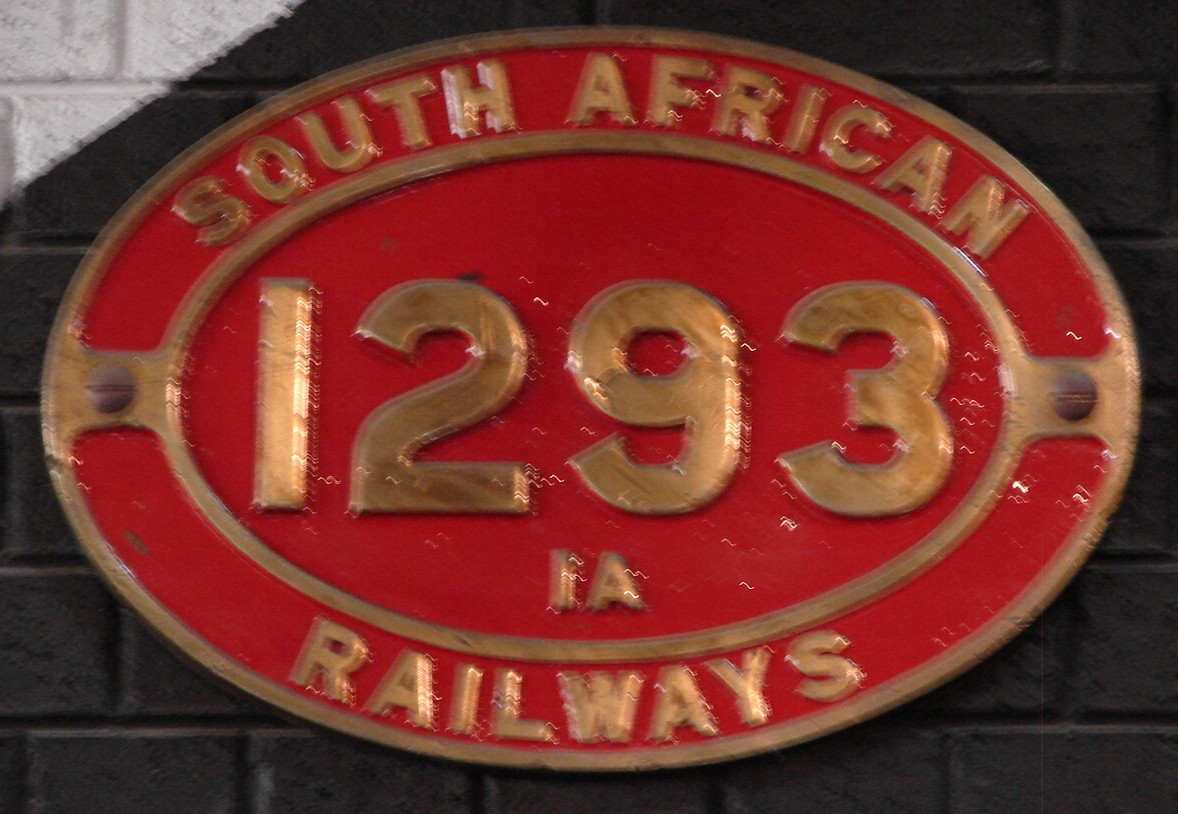

When the Union of South Africa was established on 31 May 1910, the three Colonial government railways (Cape Government Railways, NGR and Central South African Railways) were united under a single administration to control and administer the railways, ports and harbours of the Union. Although the South African Railways and Harbours came into existence in 1910, the actual classification and renumbering of all the rolling stock of the three constituent railways were only implemented with effect from 1 January 1912.

In 1912, these locomotives were renumbered in the range from 1289 to 1309 and designated Class 1A on the South African Railways (SAR).

== Service ==
When new, they were used to haul fast passenger and goods trains between Durban and Pietermaritzburg. In SAR service, they were also used on mainline workings out of Port Elizabeth. In later years they were relegated to shunting, particularly working in Natal but also in Cape Town, Port Elizabeth, East London and in Transvaal. None of them was reboilered with a Watson Standard boiler with a round-topped firebox.

In their last years, few Class 1 and Class 1A locomotives were still at work. As at April 1973, for example, there were still three working at Mason's Mill in Pietermaritzburg and one in the Eastern Transvaal, two of them Class 1A. The last Class 1A locomotive was retired by the SAR in November 1974.

In industrial service, no. 1301 survived longer and was still in service as Apex Mines no. 3 at Greenside in 1984. In 2019, 1301 was donated by Apex Mines to UK based North British Locomotive Preservation Group. It is planned to restore the locomotive at the Wonderboom Transport Museum, Pretoria before repatriating it to the UK.

== Works numbers and renumbering ==
Their works numbers, numbering and SAR renumbering are listed in the table.

NGR Class B 4-8-0 of 1910 SAR Class 1A 4-8-0
| Works no. | NGR no. | SAR no. |
|---|---|---|
| 19051 | 13 | 1289 |
| 19052 | 14 | 1290 |
| 19053 | 15 | 1291 |
| 19054 | 16 | 1292 |
| 19055 | 17 | 1293 |
| 19056 | 18 | 1294 |
| 19057 | 19 | 1295 |
| 19058 | 20 | 1296 |
| 19059 | 21 | 1297 |
| 19060 | 22 | 1298 |
| 19061 | 23 | 1299 |
| 19062 | 24 | 1300 |
| 19063 | 25 | 1301 |
| 19064 | 26 | 1302 |
| 19065 | 27 | 1303 |
| 19066 | 28 | 1304 |
| 19067 | 29 | 1305 |
| 19068 | 30 | 1306 |
| 19069 | 31 | 1307 |
| 19070 | 32 | 1308 |
| 19071 | 33 | 1309 |

== Preservation ==
One example has survived into preservation.

| Number | Works # | Owner | Current Location |
|---|---|---|---|
| 1301 | 19063 | North British Locomotive Preservation Group | Greenside Colliery |

== Illustration ==
The main picture shows a Class 1A locomotive with a modified Type TJ tender, while the following picture shows one with a Type TL tender which was rebuilt from a Type TJ tender c. 1930.

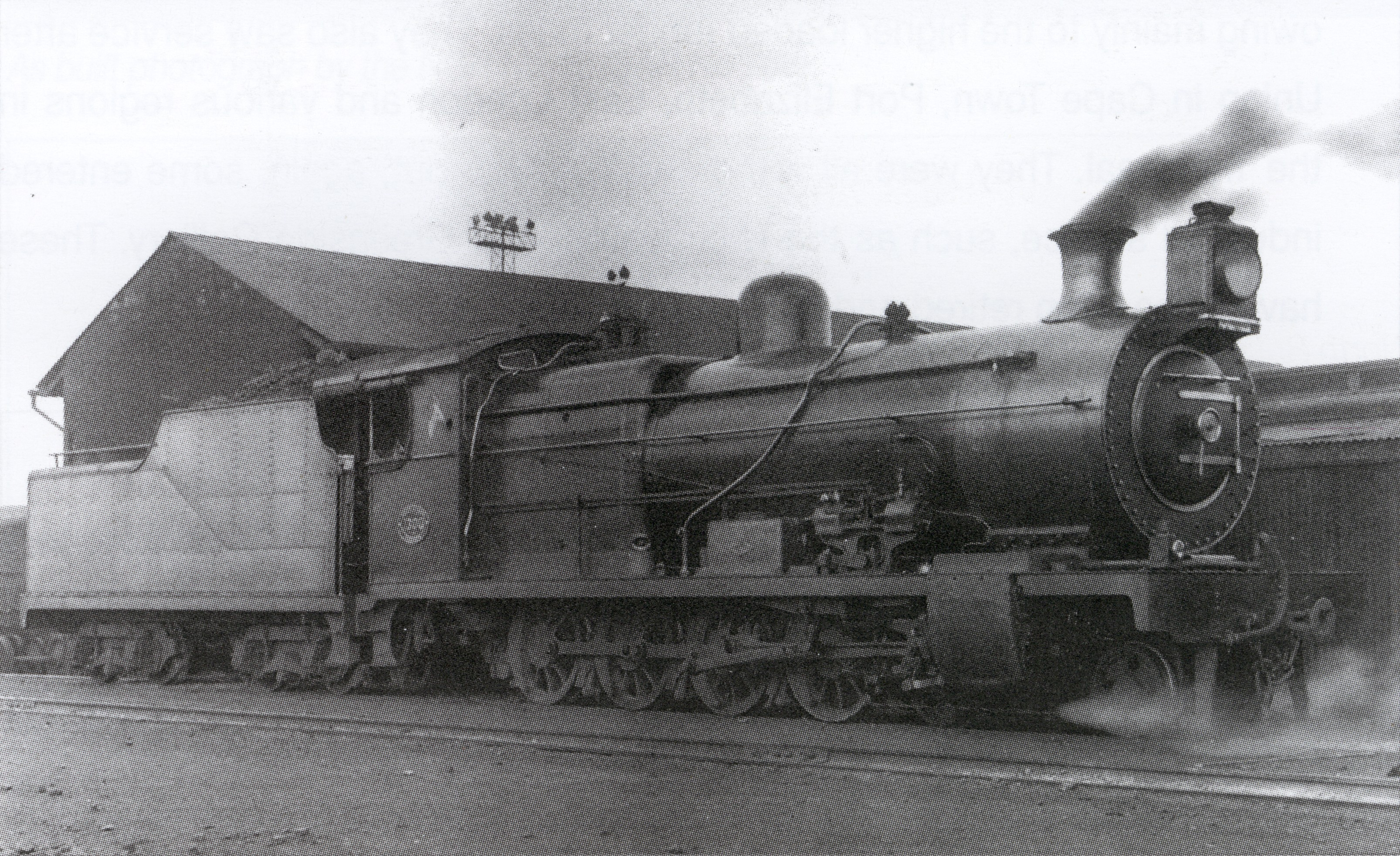
Class 1A no. 1300 with Type TL tender, c. 1930
