= South African Class 3B 4-8-2 =

1911 design of steam locomotive

South African Classes 3B & 3BR 4-8-2
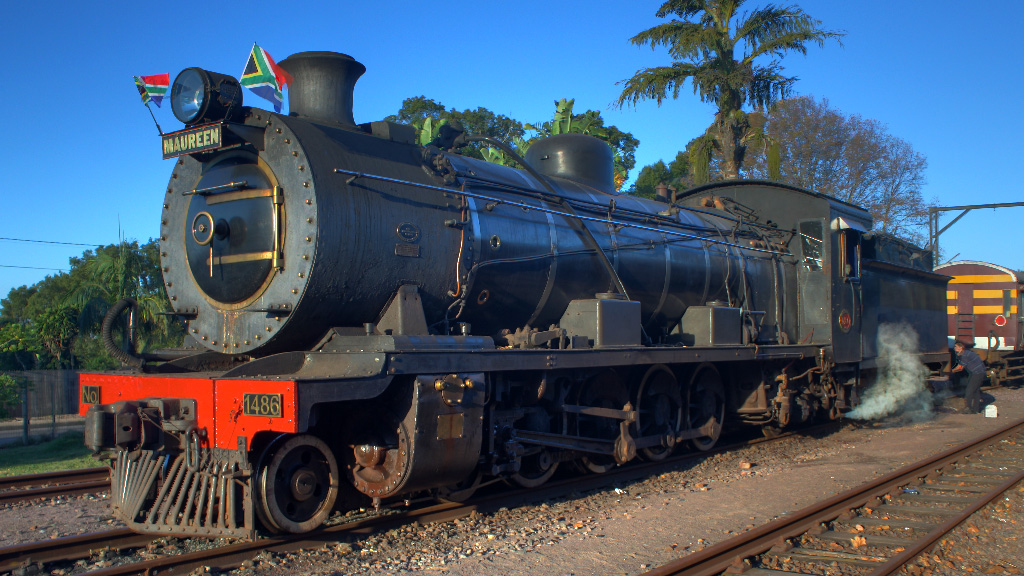
- No. 1486 Maureen at Kloof, 6 June 2010
Type and origin
- ♠ Class 3B as built with a Belpaire firebox ♥ Class 3BR rebuilt with a Watson Standard boiler ♣ Steel firebox – ♦ Copper firebox
- Power type: Steam
- Designer: Natal Government Railways (D.A. Hendrie)
- Builder: North British Locomotive Company
- Serial number: 19597-19601, 19688-19692
- Model: Class 3B
- Build date: 1911–1912
- Total produced: 10
Specifications
- Configuration
  - Whyte: 4-8-2 (Mountain)
  - UIC: 2'D1'h2
- Driver: 2nd coupled axle
- Gauge: 3 ft 6 in (1,067 mm) Cape gauge
- Leading dia.: 28 1/2 in (724 mm)
- Coupled dia.: 45 1/2 in (1,156 mm) as built 46 in (1,168 mm) retyred
- Trailing dia.: 30 in (762 mm)
- Tender wheels: 30 in (762 mm)
- Wheelbase: 55 ft 8 in (16,967 mm)
  - Engine: 30 ft 9 in (9,373 mm)
  - Leading: 6 ft (1,829 mm)
  - Coupled: 12 ft 9 in (3,886 mm)
  - Tender: 16 ft 6 in (5,029 mm)
  - Tender bogie: 4 ft 6 in (1,372 mm)
- Length
  - Over couplers: 63 ft 2 3/4 in (19,272 mm)
- Height: ♠ 12 ft 6 in (3,810 mm) ♥ 12 ft 4 3/4 in (3,778 mm)
- Frame type: Plate
- Axle load: ♠ 15 LT 12 cwt (15,850 kg) ♥♦ 15 LT 11 cwt (15,800 kg)
  - Leading: ♠ 14 LT 2 cwt (14,330 kg) ♥♦ 14 LT 1 cwt (14,280 kg)
  - 1st coupled: ♠ 14 LT 10 cwt (14,730 kg) ♥♦ 14 LT 15 cwt (14,990 kg)
  - 2nd coupled: ♠ 15 LT 12 cwt (15,850 kg) ♥♦ 15 LT 11 cwt (15,800 kg)
  - 3rd coupled: ♠ 15 LT (15,240 kg) ♥♦ 15 LT 2 cwt (15,340 kg)
  - 4th coupled: ♠ 15 LT (15,240 kg) ♥♦ 14 LT 11 cwt (14,780 kg)
  - Trailing: ♠ 9 LT 10 cwt (9,652 kg) ♥♦ 10 LT 6 cwt (10,470 kg)
  - Tender bogie: Bogie 1: 21 LT 14 cwt (22,050 kg); Bogie 2: 21 LT 16 cwt (22,150 kg)
  - Tender axle: 10 LT 18 cwt (11,070 kg)
- Adhesive weight: ♠ 60 LT 2 cwt (61,060 kg) ♥♦ 59 LT 19 cwt (60,910 kg)
- Loco weight: ♠ 83 LT 14 cwt (85,040 kg) ♥♦ 84 LT 14 cwt (86,060 kg)
- Tender weight: 43 LT 10 cwt (44,200 kg)
- Total weight: ♠ 127 LT 4 cwt (129,200 kg) ♥♦ 128 LT 4 cwt (130,300 kg)
- Tender type: TM (2-axle bogies); TJ, TL, TM permitted
- Fuel type: Coal
- Fuel capacity: 8 LT 5 cwt (8.4 t)
- Water cap.: 4,000 imp gal (18,200 L)
- Firebox
  - Type: ♠ Belpaire – ♥ Round-top
  - Grate area: ♠ 34 sq ft (3.2 m^{2}) ♥ 37 sq ft (3.4 m^{2})
- Boiler
  - Model: ♥ Watson Standard no. 2
  - Pitch: ♠ 7 ft 4 1/2 in (2,248 mm) ♥ 7 ft 5 1/2 in (2,273 mm)
  - Diameter: ♠ 5 ft 6 1/8 in (1,680 mm) ♥ 5 ft 7 1/2 in (1,714 mm)
  - Tube plates: ♠ 18 ft 6 in (5,639 mm) ♥♣ 19 ft 4 in (5,893 mm) ♥♦ 19 ft 3 5/8 in (5,883 mm)
  - Small tubes: ♠ 135: 2 1/4 in (57 mm) ♥ 87: 2 1/2 in (64 mm)
  - Large tubes: ♠ 24: 5 1/2 in (140 mm) ♥ 30: 5 1/2 in (140 mm)
- Boiler pressure: ♠ 185 psi (1,276 kPa) ♥ 190 psi (1,310 kPa)
- Safety valve: ♠ Ramsbottom ♥ Pop
- Heating surface
  - Firebox: ♠ 135 sq ft (12.5 m^{2}) ♥ 142 sq ft (13.2 m^{2})
  - Tubes: ♠ 2,110 sq ft (196 m^{2}) ♥ 1,933 sq ft (179.6 m^{2})
  - Total surface: ♠ 2,245 sq ft (208.6 m^{2}) ♥ 2,075 sq ft (192.8 m^{2})
- Superheater
  - Heating area: ♠ 617 sq ft (57.3 m^{2}) ♥ 492 sq ft (45.7 m^{2})
- Cylinders: Two
- Cylinder size: 22 in (559 mm) bore 24 in (610 mm) stroke
- Valve gear: Walschaerts
- Valve type: Piston
- Couplers: Johnston link-and-pin AAR knuckle (1930s)
Performance figures
- Tractive effort: ♠ 35,030 lbf (155.8 kN) @ 75% ♥ 35,980 lbf (160.0 kN) @ 75%
Career
- Operators: South African Railways
- Class: Class 3B & 3BR
- Number in class: 10
- Numbers: 1479–1488
- Delivered: 1912
- First run: 1912
- Withdrawn: 1976
- The leading coupled axle had flangeless wheels

The South African Railways Class 3B 4-8-2 of 1912 was a steam locomotive.

In 1912, the South African Railways took delivery of ten Class 3B steam locomotives with a 4-8-2 Mountain type wheel arrangement which had been ordered by the Natal Government Railways the year before.

== Manufacturer ==
With the experience gained from the sole experimental Class B American D locomotive, Natal Government Railways (NGR) Locomotive Superintendent D.A. Hendrie redesigned his Class Hendrie D and placed orders for ten locomotives with the North British Locomotive Company on 29 March 1911. These locomotives, which would have become the NGR's Class Superheated Hendrie D, were built in two batches of five and were all delivered in 1912 after the renumbering and reclassification of the locomotives of the constituent former Colonial railways into the South African Railways (SAR). Upon delivery, they were therefore taken directly onto the SAR roster, numbered in the range from 1479 to 1488 and designated Class 3B. The first of these engines entered service in February 1912.

== Characteristics ==
Like the NGR Class Hendrie D which it was based on and which was later designated the SAR Class 3, the Class 3B had plate frames, Walschaerts valve gear and Belpaire fireboxes. They were the first of Hendrie's designs to have superheaters and, as a result, piston valves instead of slide valves. They also sported a new design of leading bogie with cast-steel framing and three-point suspension links.

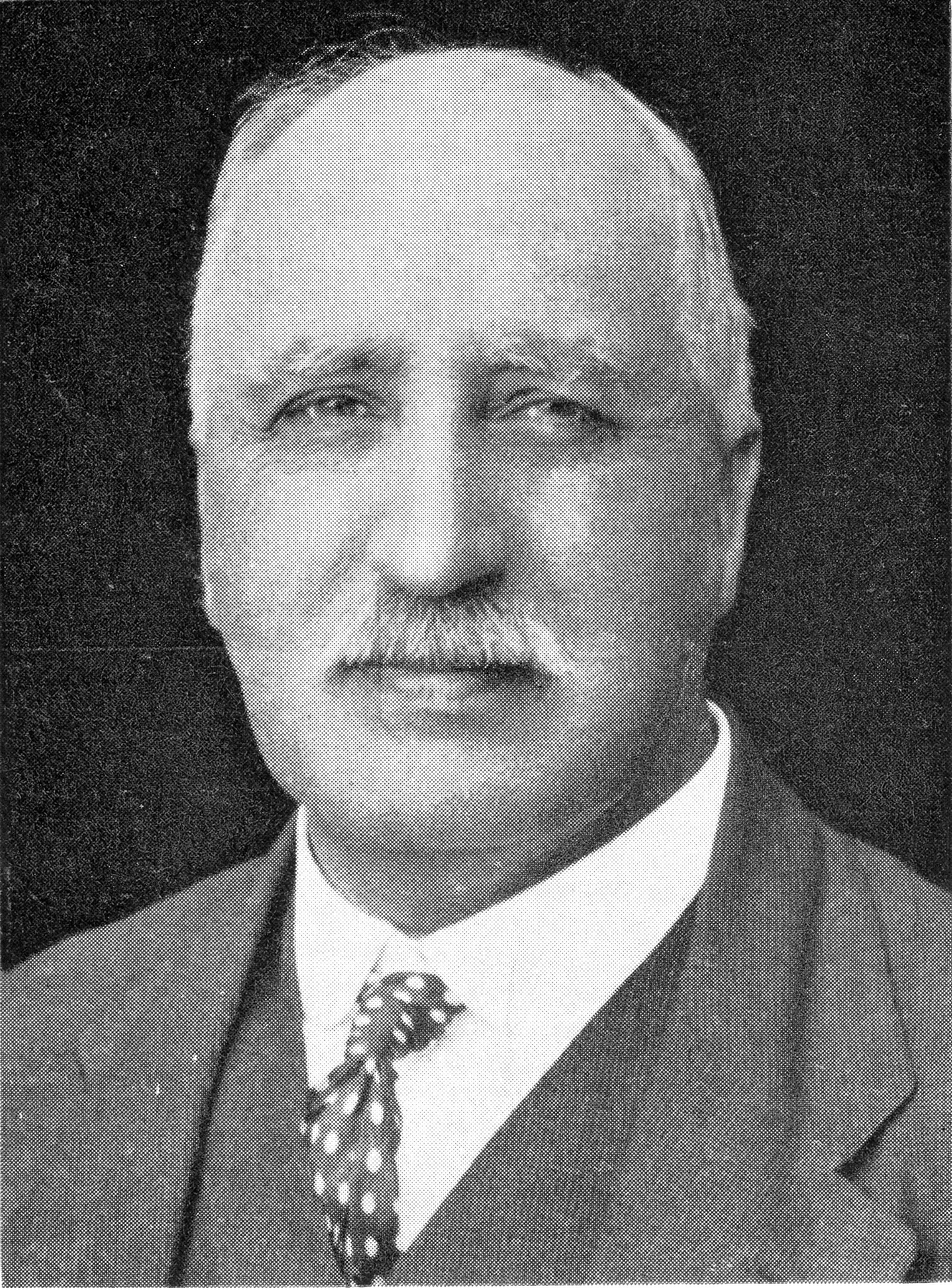
D.A. Hendrie

To accommodate the redesigned cylinders and the necessary alteration to the Walschaerts valve gear, the running boards had to be raised to clear the steam chests and motion. This resulted in the gentle sweeps at either end where the running boards dropped down to the buffer beam and below the cab. These curves became a Hendrie hallmark and enhanced the appearance of the locomotive. In other respects, however, they were practically identical to the Class 3.

The locomotives were delivered with Type TM tenders with an 8 long tons 5 hundredweight (8.4 tonnes) coal capacity and a 4,000 imperial gallons (18,200 litres) water capacity. When the coupled wheels were retyred, their diameter on tread was increased from 45 1/2 to 46 inches (1,156 to 1,168 millimetres). This reduced their tractive effort to 35,030 pounds-force (155.8 kilonewtons) at 75% of boiler pressure, which was set at 185 pounds per square inch (1,276 kilopascals). The engines, as built, had flangeless wheels on the leading coupled axle, but these were subsequently also flanged as shown in official SAR dimensional locomotive drawings.

The superheated Class 3B 4-8-2 Mountain type became the forerunner of the most numerous basic type of steam locomotive to be used in South Africa.

== Watson Standard boilers ==
In the 1930s, many serving locomotives were reboilered with a standard boiler type designed by then Chief Mechanical Engineer (CME) A.G. Watson as part of his standardisation policy. Such Watson Standard reboilered locomotives were reclassified by adding an "R" suffix to their classification.

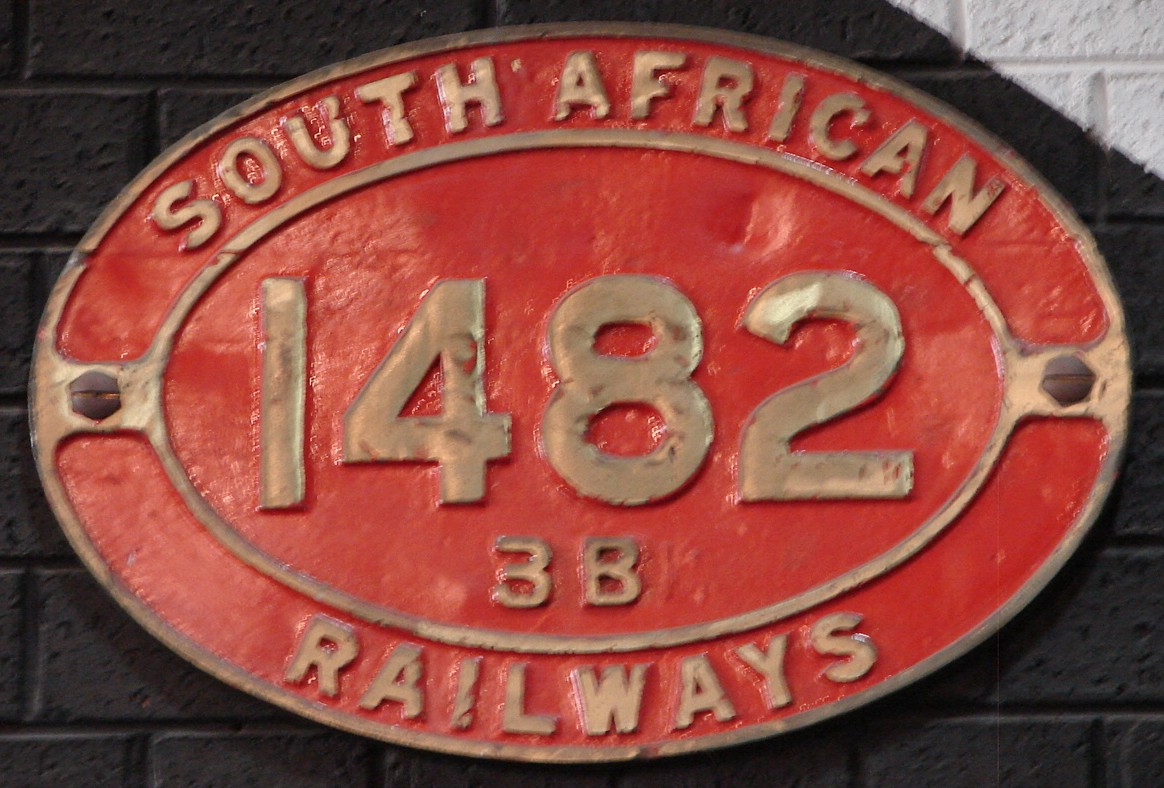

When all ten Class 3B locomotives were eventually reboilered with Watson Standard no. 2 boilers, they were therefore reclassified to Class 3BR. Reboilering raised their boiler pitch by 1 inch (25 millimetres), while the boiler pressure was set at 190 pounds per square inch (1,310 kilopascals). Their original Belpaire boilers were fitted with Ramsbottom safety valves, while the Watson Standard boiler was fitted with Pop safety valves. Probably at the same time, their Type TM tenders were rebuilt to the more attractive smooth-sided Type TL tenders. The most obvious visual difference between an original and a Watson Standard reboilered locomotive is usually a rectangular regulator cover just to the rear of the chimney on the reboilered locomotive. In the case of the Class 3BR locomotive, an even more obvious visual distinction is the absence of the Belpaire firebox hump between the cab and the boiler.

== Service ==
=== South African Railways ===
The Class 3B was placed in service on the upper section of the Natal mainline. They were later also used in the Eastern Transvaal and the Eastern Cape. Towards the end of their service lives, they ended up in Cape Town, where they were used as shunting engines until the last ones were withdrawn from SAR service by 1976.

=== Industrial ===
Most of them ended up in service on South Africa's coal and gold mines. Only one of them had been withdrawn by April 1973. At the time when the other nine began to be withdrawn from railway service, the world oil crisis of the mid-1970s had erupted and all nine were virtually snapped up by industrial users responding to the South African Government's call to save oil by using alternative sources of energy. Ironically, at the same time, the State-owned SAR was replacing steam with diesel-electric locomotives.

The ten individual locomotives were disposed of as follows:

- No. 1479 was scrapped by 1973 and not sold.
- No. 1480 went to Vaal Reefs at Orkney as no. 4.
- No. 1481 went to Landau Colliery at Witbank as no. 3 and was eventually staged at Landau for the South African National Railway And Steam Museum (SANRASM).
- No. 1482 went to Western Holdings as no. 7 and later to Freegold North as no. 8.
- No. 1483 went to Blesbok Colliery as no. 3, later to Springbok Colliery and was eventually staged at ESKOM's Komati Power Station for SANRASM.
- No. 1484 went to Springbok Colliery as Hope, then to Southern Cross Steel, then to Umgala Colliery as no. 8 and was eventually staged by SANRASM at Krugersdorp.
- No. 1485 went to Free State Saaiplaas Gold Mine as no. 1 and was eventually staged at Odendaalsrus.
- No. 1486 went to Western Holdings as no. 5, later to Umgala Colliery, and was eventually acquired by Umgeni Steam Railway at Pinetown and restored as their engine Maureen.
- No. 1487 went to Free State Geduld as no. 5, later to Freegold North as no. 9 and was eventually staged at Odendaalsrus.
- No. 1488 went to Vaal Reefs at Orkney as no. 5.

== Preservation ==
Two 3B class survive.

Number	Works nmr	THF / Private	Leaselend / Owner	Current Location	Outside South Africa	?
1486	NBL / 19690	Private	Umgeni Steam Railway	Ichanga station		
1488	NBL / 19692	Private	Oscar Sabitini	Krugersdorp Locomotive Depot		

== Illustration ==
The main picture shows Umgeni Steam Railway's Class 3BR no. 1486 Maureen at Kloof station on 6 June 2010, while the following show the Class in its original as-delivered SAR livery and in two of the mining liveries which were applied to it while in industrial service.

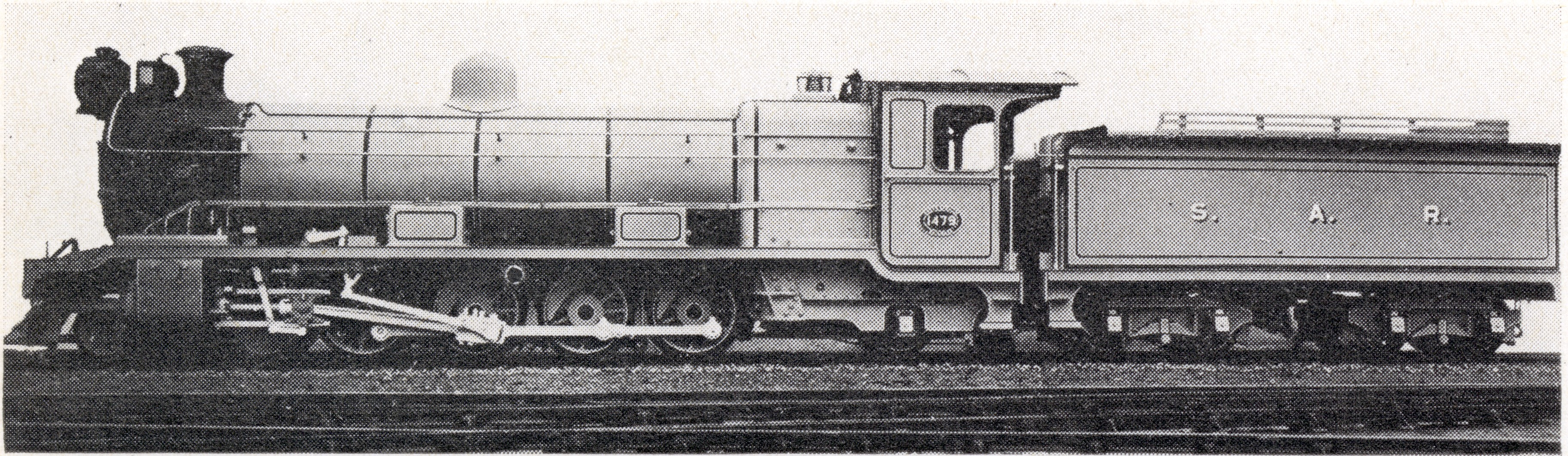
Class 3B, as built with Belpaire firebox and Type TM tender, c. 1912

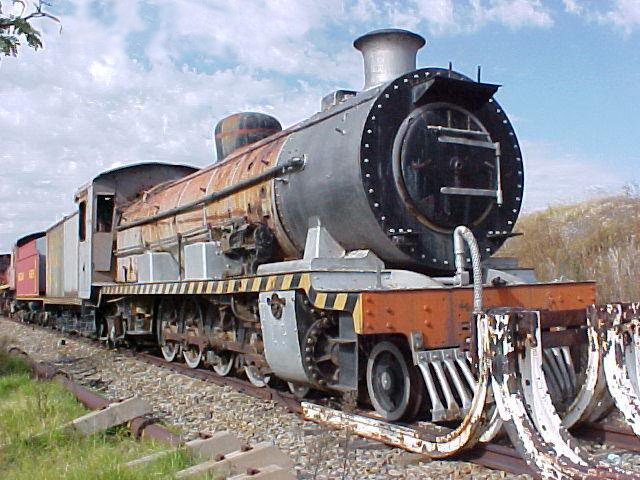
Reboilered Class 3BR, ex SAR no. 1485, as Free State Saaiplaas Gold Mine no. 1, Odendaalsrus, 29 May 2005

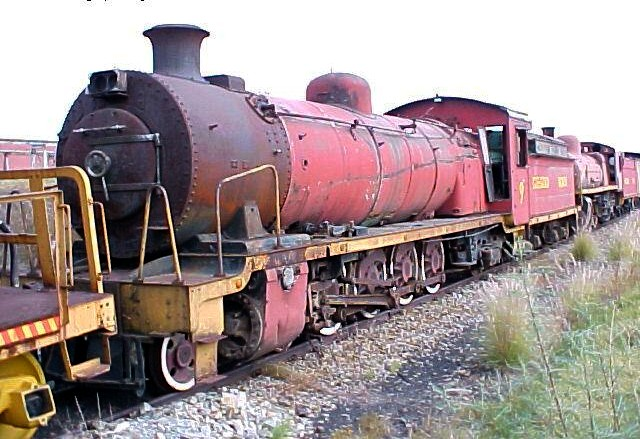
Reboilered Class 3BR, ex SAR no. 1487, as Freegold North Gold Mine no. 9, Odendaalsrus, 29 May 2005
