= South African type TM tender =

Steam locomotive tender in South Africa

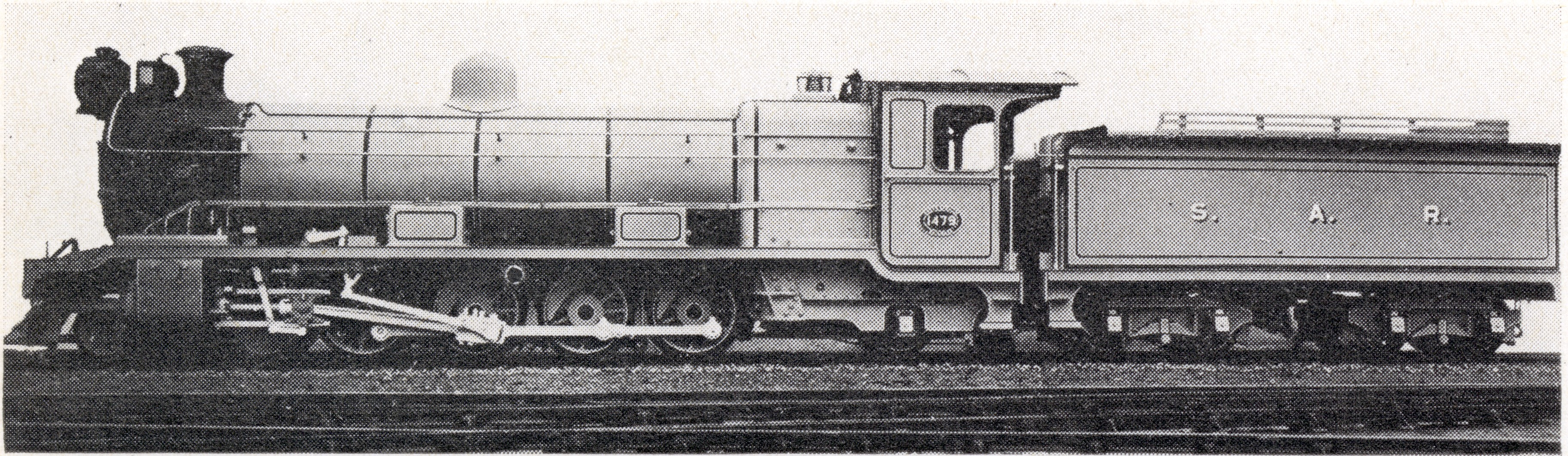
- Type TM tender on SAR Class 3B
Type and origin
- Locomotive: NGR Class B of 1909; SAR Class 3B; SAR Class MC
- Designer: Natal Government Railways (D.A. Hendrie)
- Builder: North British Locomotive Company
- In service: 1911-1912
- Rebuilder: South African Railways
- Rebuild date: c. 1925
- Rebuilt to: Type TL, Type XM1
Specifications
- Configuration: 2-axle bogies
- Gauge: 3 ft 6 in (1,067 mm) Cape gauge
- Length: 24 ft 2 7/8 in (7,388 mm)
- Wheel dia.: 30 in (762 mm)
- Wheelbase: 16 ft 6 in (5,029 mm)
  - Bogie: 4 ft 6 in (1,372 mm)
- Axle load: 10 LT 18 cwt (11,070 kg)
  - Front bogie: 21 LT 14 cwt (22,050 kg)
  - Rear bogie: 21 LT 16 cwt (22,150 kg)
- Weight empty: 38,960 lb (17,670 kg)
- Weight w/o: 43 LT 10 cwt (44,200 kg)
- Fuel type: Coal
- Fuel cap.: 8 LT 5 cwt (8.4 t)
- Water cap.: 4,000 imp gal (18,200 L)
- Stoking: Manual
- Couplers: Drawbar & Johnston link-and-pin Drawbar & AAR knuckle (1930s)
Career
- Operators: Natal Government Railways; South African Railways
- Numbers: SAR 1451-1475, 1479-1488, 1607-1616

The South African type TM tender was a steam locomotive tender from the pre-Union era in the Natal Colony.

The Type TM tender first entered service in 1911, as tenders to a second batch of 25 Class B 4-8-2 Mountain type steam locomotives which were ordered by the Natal Government Railways in that year. These locomotives were designated Class 3 on the South African Railways in 1912.

== Manufacturer ==
Type TM tenders were built between 1910 and 1912 by the North British Locomotive Company (NBL).

The Natal Government Railways (NGR) placed its second batch of 25 Class B Mountain type locomotives in service in 1911. The locomotive and tender were designed by NGR Locomotive Superintendent D.A. Hendrie and built by NBL. Known as the Hendrie D, but officially designated Class B on the NGR, it was the first true Mountain type locomotive in the world.

The Type TM first entered service as tenders to these 25 locomotives. More entered service on the South African Railways (SAR) in 1912, as tenders to the ten Class 3B 4-8-2 Mountain type and ten Class MC 2-6-6-0 Denver type Mallet locomotives, both of which were also built by NBL.

== Characteristics ==
The tender had a coal capacity of 8 long tons 5 hundredweight (8.4 tonnes), a water capacity of 4,000 imperial gallons (18,200 litres) and a maximum axle load of 10 long tons 18 hundredweight (11,070 kilograms).

== Locomotives ==
During the classification and renumbering of locomotives onto the SAR roster in 1912, no separate classification and renumbering list was published for tenders, which should also have been renumbered according to the locomotive renumbering list. In most cases, an oval number plate, bearing the engine number and often also the tender type, was attached to the rear end of the tender. Three locomotive classes were delivered new with Type TM tenders, which were numbered or renumbered for their engines in the SAR number ranges as shown.

- 1910: NGR Class B 4-8-2 of 1909, SAR Class 3, numbers 1451 to 1475.
- 1912: SAR Class 3B, numbers 1479 to 1488.
- 1912: SAR Class MC, numbers 1607 to 1616.

== Classification letters ==
Since many tender types are interchangeable between different locomotive classes and types, a tender classification system was adopted by the SAR. The first letter of the tender type indicates the classes of engines to which it could be coupled. The "T_" tenders could be used with the locomotive classes as shown, although engine drawbars had to be replaced to suit the target locomotive in some cases. To couple Type TM tenders off the Class MC to the Classes 3 and 3B, the engine drawbar had to be 6 feet 9 3/4 inches (2,076 millimetres) long, and a drawbar had to be fitted to suit to couple any Type TM tender to Class 1A engines.

- NGR Class B 4-8-0 of 1910, SAR Class 1A.
- NGR Class A 4-6-2 of 1910, SAR Class 2C.
- NGR Class B 4-8-2 of 1909, SAR Class 3.
- SAR Class 3B.
- SAR Class MC.

The second letter indicates the tender's water capacity. The "_M" tenders had a capacity of 4,000 imperial gallons (18,200 litres; 4,800 US gallons).

== Modifications and rebuilding ==
=== Modification to Type XM1 ===
At some stage before 1941, the intermediate draw and buffing gear of two of the tenders, numbers 1607 and 1615 off Class MC Mallet locomotives, were altered to an "X_" tender configuration. These tenders were reclassified to Type XM1.

=== Rebuilding to Type TL ===
From c. 1925, several of the Type TM tenders were completely rebuilt by the SAR by mounting a new upper structure on the existing underframe, with 100 imperial gallons (455 litres) smaller water tanks and a 10 long hundredweight (0.5 tonnes) larger coal capacity. These rebuilt tenders had a more modern appearance, with flush sides all the way to the top of the coal bunker. They were designated Type TL.

The program to rebuild several older tender types with new upper structures was begun by Colonel F.R. Collins DSO, who approved several of the detailed drawings for the work during his term in office as Chief Mechanical Engineer of the SAR from 1922 to 1929. It was continued by his successor, A.G. Watson.

== Illustration ==
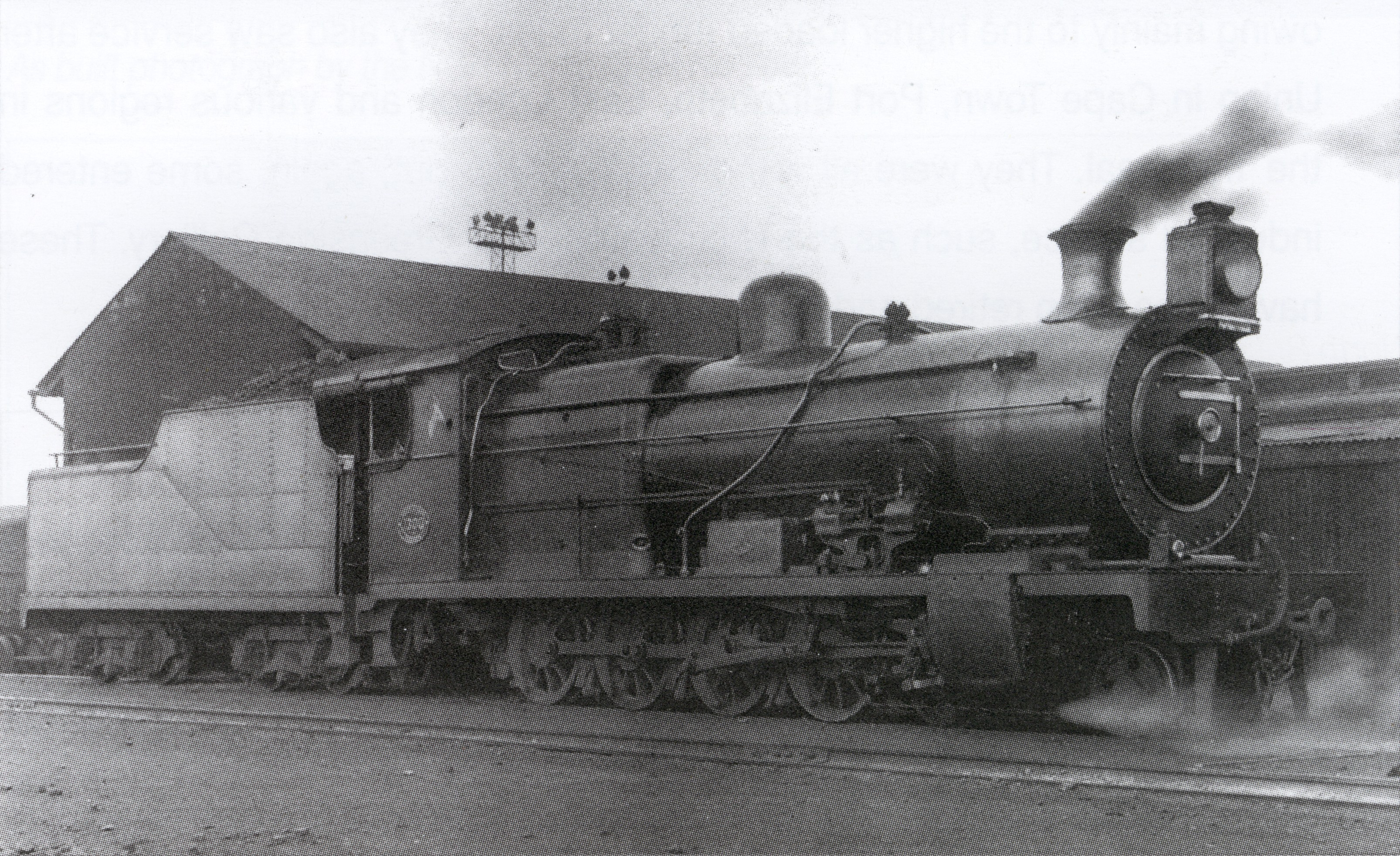
Rebuilt Type TL on Class 1A, c. 1930
