= South African Class 2C 4-6-2 =

1910 design of steam locomotive

NGR Class A 4-6-2 1910 South African Class 2C 4-6-2
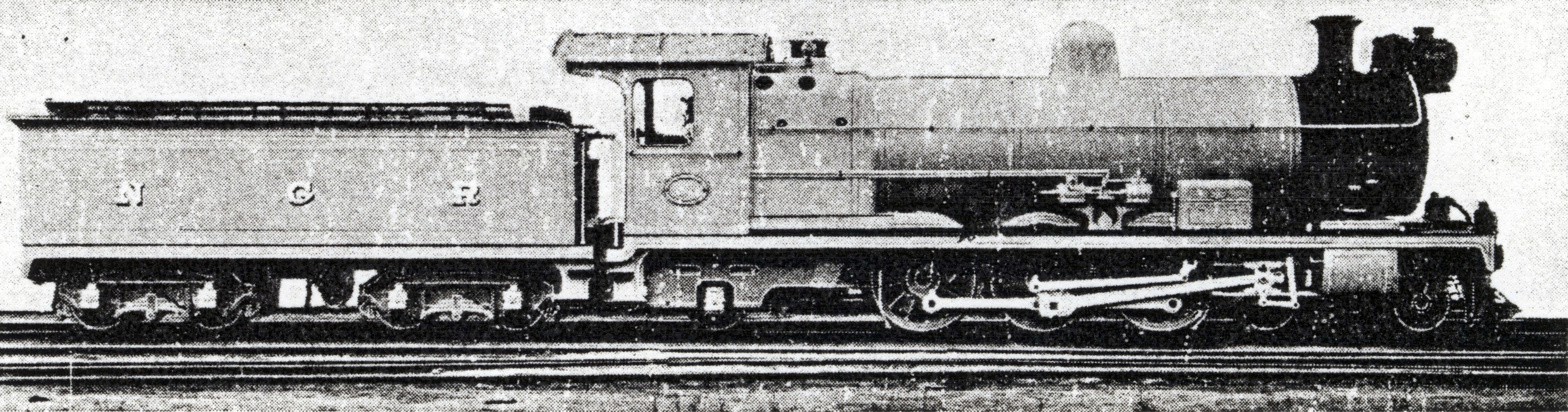
- NGR Class A, c. 1910
Type and origin
- Power type: Steam
- Designer: Natal Government Railways (D.A. Hendrie)
- Builder: Natal Government Railways
- Model: NGR Hendrie C
- Build date: 1910
- Total produced: 2
Specifications
- Configuration
  - Whyte: 4-6-2 (Pacific)
  - UIC: 2'C1'n2
- Driver: 2nd coupled axle
- Gauge: 3 ft 6 in (1,067 mm) Cape gauge
- Leading dia.: 28 1/2 in (724 mm)
- Coupled dia.: 52 1/2 in (1,334 mm)
- Trailing dia.: 30 in (762 mm)
- Tender wheels: 30 in (762 mm)
- Wheelbase: 52 ft 7 1/2 in (16,040 mm)
  - Engine: 28 ft (8,534 mm)
  - Leading: 6 ft (1,829 mm)
  - Coupled: 9 ft 6 in (2,896 mm)
  - Tender: 16 ft 6 in (5,029 mm)
  - Tender bogie: 4 ft 6 in (1,372 mm)
- Length
  - Over couplers: 60 ft 2 1/4 in (18,345 mm)
- Height: 12 ft 6 in (3,810 mm)
- Frame type: Plate
- Axle load: 15 LT 7 cwt (15,600 kg)
  - Leading: 13 LT 6 cwt 2 qtr (13,540 kg)
  - 1st coupled: 15 LT 6 cwt (15,550 kg)
  - 2nd coupled: 15 LT 7 cwt (15,600 kg)
  - 3rd coupled: 14 LT 7 cwt (14,580 kg)
  - Trailing: 10 LT 13 cwt (10,820 kg)
  - Tender bogie: Bogie 1: 20 LT 1 cwt (20,370 kg); Bogie 2: 20 LT 10 cwt (20,830 kg)
  - Tender axle: 10 LT 5 cwt (10,410 kg)
- Adhesive weight: 45 LT (45,720 kg)
- Loco weight: 69 LT 9 cwt 2 qtr (70,590 kg)
- Tender weight: 40 LT 11 cwt (41,200 kg)
- Total weight: 110 LT 0 cwt 2 qtr (111,800 kg)
- Tender type: TJ (2-axle bogies)
- Fuel type: Coal
- Fuel capacity: 6 LT (6.1 t)
- Water cap.: 3,500 imp gal (15,900 L)
- Firebox
  - Type: Belpaire
  - Grate area: 29 sq ft (2.7 m^{2})
- Boiler
  - Pitch: 7 ft 4 in (2,235 mm)
  - Diameter: 5 ft 5/8 in (1,540 mm)
  - Tube plates: 16 ft 11 1/2 in (5,169 mm)
  - Small tubes: 248: 2 in (51 mm)
- Boiler pressure: 185 psi (1,276 kPa)
- Safety valve: Ramsbottom
- Heating surface
  - Firebox: 121 sq ft (11.2 m^{2})
  - Tubes: 2,201 sq ft (204.5 m^{2})
  - Total surface: 2,322 sq ft (215.7 m^{2})
- Cylinders: Two
- Cylinder size: 19 in (483 mm) bore 24 in (610 mm) stroke
- Valve gear: Walschaerts
- Couplers: Johnston link-and-pin AAR knuckle (1930s)
Performance figures
- Tractive effort: 22,910 lbf (101.9 kN) @ 75%
Career
- Operators: Natal Government Railways; South African Railways
- Class: NGR Class A SAR Class 2C
- Number in class: 2
- Numbers: NGR 11-12; SAR 765-766
- Nicknames: Hendrie C
- Delivered: 1910
- First run: 1910
- Withdrawn: 1936
- The 2nd coupled axle had flangeless wheels

The South African Railways Class 2C 4-6-2 of 1910 was a steam locomotive from the pre-Union era in the Colony of Natal.

In 1910, the Natal Government Railways placed two Class A steam locomotives with a 4-6-2 Pacific wheel arrangement in service, built in their Durban workshops. In 1912, when these locomotives were assimilated into the South African Railways, they were renumbered and designated Class 2C. The 2A and 2B classifications were never used.

The Class 2C was the second locomotive type to be designed and built in South Africa, after the Natal Government Railways 4-6-2TT Havelock of 1888.

== Manufacturer ==
When more locomotives were required for passenger traffic on the Natal Government Railways (NGR) mainline on the section between Estcourt and Charlestown on the Transvaal border, where gradients were less severe than in the coastal region, two 4-6-2 Pacific type locomotives were built in the Durban workshops of the NGR and equipped with Type TJ tenders. The locomotive was designed during 1907 by NGR Locomotive Superintendent D.A. Hendrie as a redesigned version of his NGR Class A Hendrie A of 1905.

== Characteristics ==
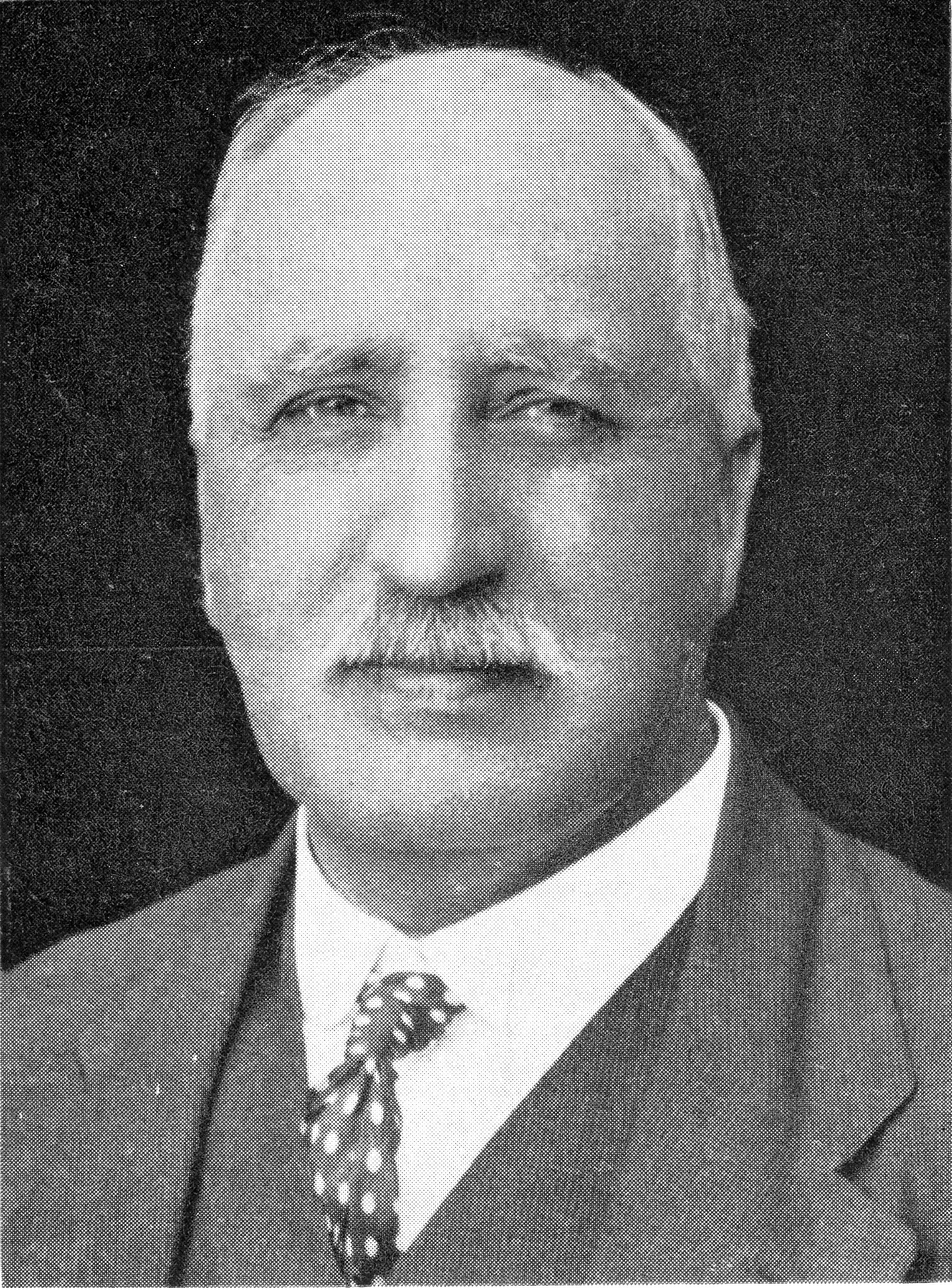
D.A. Hendrie

The Hendrie C, as it was popularly known, was similar to the Class A Hendrie A in general proportions, but with Walschaerts valve gear, 1 1/2 inches (38 millimetres) larger diameter coupled wheels, a larger boiler with a higher boiler pressure and a more enclosed cab which offered better protection to the crew. They were equipped with Hendrie's steam reversing gear and had wide Belpaire fireboxes, carried down between the rear frames which had been widened by using a bridle casting.

The cylinders were mounted horizontally since the Walschaerts valve gear did not require inclined cylinders like those on the Class A Hendrie A with its Stephenson valve gear. The coupled wheels were later retyred to a larger diameter, from 52 1/2 to 54 inches (1,334 to 1,372 millimetres).

== Service ==
=== Natal Government Railways ===
When they were placed in service in 1910, they were also designated NGR Class A, with engine numbers 11 and 12. The two locomotives joined the two Class A Hendrie A Pacifics of 1905 on the section from Estcourt to Charlestown.

=== South African Railways ===
When the Union of South Africa was established on 31 May 1910, the three Colonial government railways (Cape Government Railways, NGR and Central South African Railways) were united under a single administration to control and administer the railways, ports and harbours of the Union. Although the South African Railways and Harbours came into existence in 1910, the actual classification and renumbering of all the rolling stock of the three constituent railways were only implemented with effect from 1 January 1912.

In 1912, the two locomotives were renumbered 765 and 766 and designated Class 2C on the South African Railways (SAR), after their popular Hendrie C nickname. The 2A and 2B classifications were never used by the SAR.

After serving on the Estcourt to Charlestown section for many years, they were transferred to the Witwatersrand for a short period, after which they were transferred to the section between Komatipoort and Waterval Boven in the Eastern Transvaal. Here they worked passenger and fast perishables trains until they were withdrawn and scrapped in 1936.

== Illustration ==
The pictures illustrate two of the NGR liveries which were applied to these locomotives.

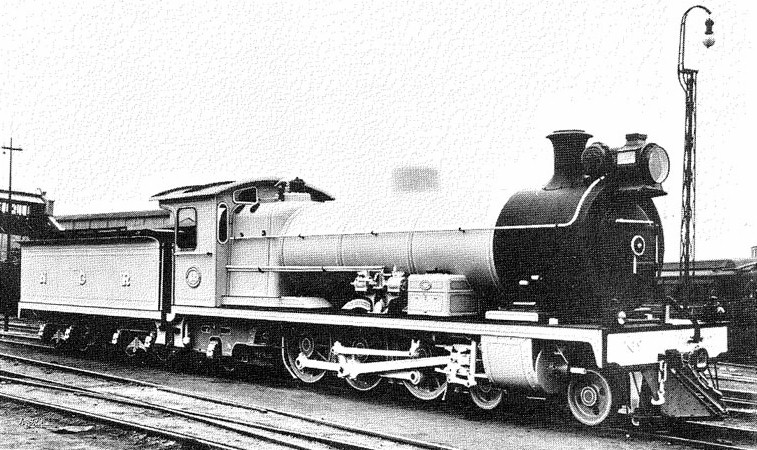
NGR no. 12, later SAR no. 766, c. 1910

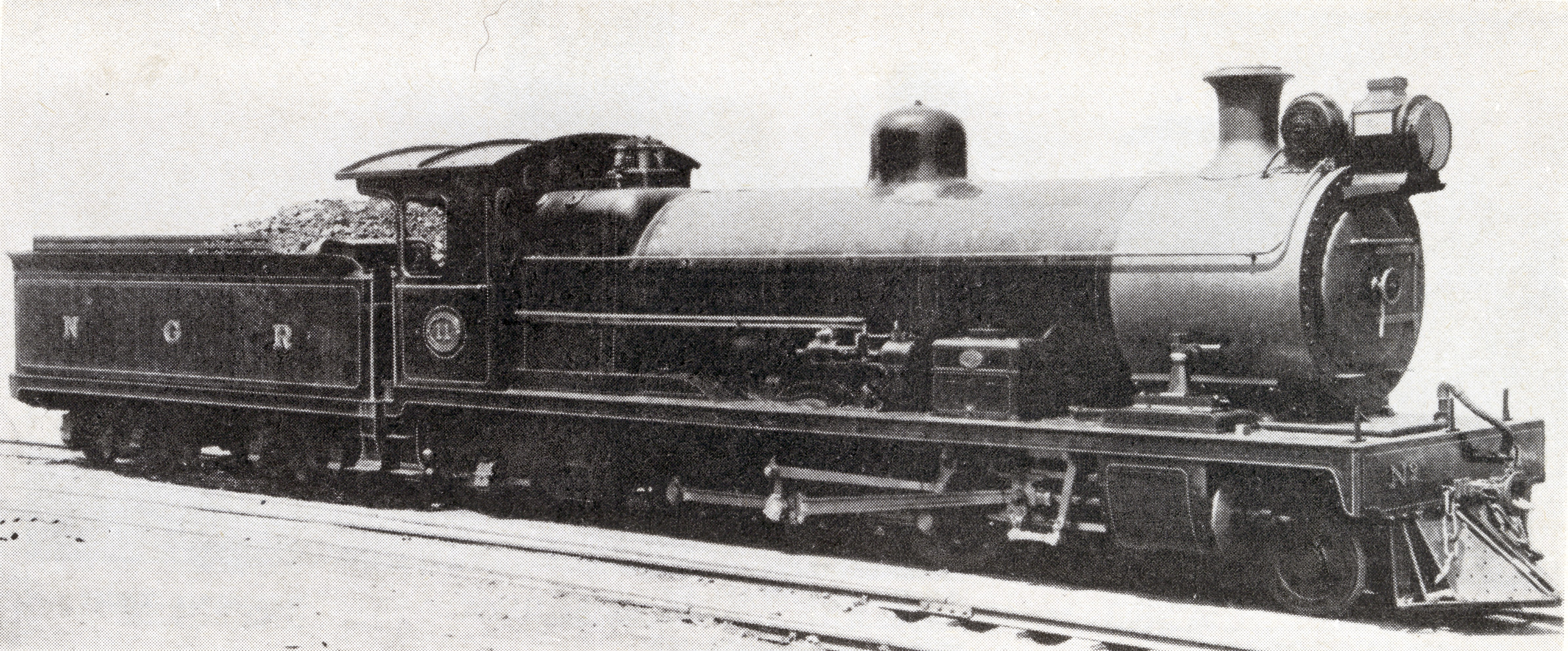
NGR no. 11, later SAR no. 765, c. 1912
