= South African Class 3 4-8-2 =

1909 design of steam locomotive

NGR Class B 4-8-2 1909 South African Classes 3 & 3R 4-8-2
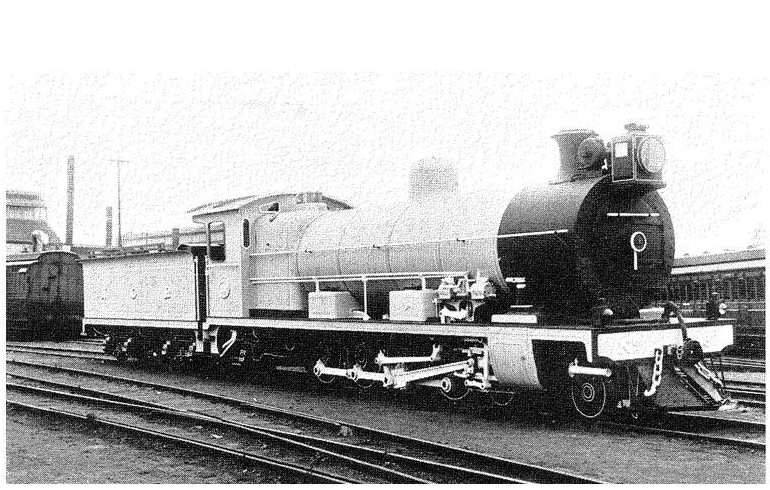
- NGR Class B no. 332, later SAR Class 3 no. 1448
Type and origin
- ♠ Class 3 as built with a Belpaire firebox ♥ Class 3R rebuilt with a Watson Standard boiler ♣ – Type TJ tender, 1st batch (1909) ♦ – Type TM tender, 2nd batch (1911)
- Power type: Steam
- Designer: Natal Government Railways (D.A. Hendrie)
- Builder: North British Locomotive Company
- Serial number: 18829-18833, 19217-19241
- Model: NGR Hendrie D
- Build date: 1909–1910
- Total produced: 30
Specifications
- Configuration
  - Whyte: 4-8-2
  - UIC: ♠ 2'D1'n2 – ♥ 2'D1'h2
- Driver: 2nd coupled axle
- Gauge: 3 ft 6 in (1,067 mm) Cape gauge
- Leading dia.: 28 1/2 in (724 mm)
- Coupled dia.: 45 1/2 in (1,156 mm)
- Trailing dia.: 30 in (762 mm)
- Tender wheels: 30 in (762 mm)
- Wheelbase: 55 ft 7 3/4 in (16,961 mm)
  - Engine: 30 ft 9 in (9,373 mm)
  - Leading: 6 ft (1,829 mm)
  - Coupled: 12 ft 9 in (3,886 mm)
  - Tender: 16 ft 6 in (5,029 mm)
  - Tender bogie: 4 ft 6 in (1,372 mm)
- Length
  - Over couplers: 63 ft 2 1/2 in (19,266 mm)
- Height: ♠ 12 ft 6 in (3,810 mm) ♥ 12 ft 4 3/4 in (3,778 mm)
- Frame type: Plate
- Axle load: ♠ 15 LT 2 cwt (15,340 kg) ♥ 15 LT 11 cwt (15,800 kg)
  - Leading: ♠ 11 LT 13 cwt 2 qtr (11,860 kg) ♥ 14 LT 4 cwt (14,430 kg)
  - 1st coupled: ♠ 14 LT 8 cwt (14,630 kg) ♥ 15 LT (15,240 kg)
  - 2nd coupled: ♠ 15 LT 2 cwt (15,340 kg) ♥ 15 LT 11 cwt (15,800 kg)
  - 3rd coupled: ♠ 14 LT 8 cwt 2 qtr (14,660 kg) ♥ 15 LT 1 cwt (15,290 kg)
  - 4th coupled: ♠ 15 LT (15,240 kg) ♥ 14 LT 18 cwt (15,140 kg)
  - Trailing: ♠ 9 LT 10 cwt (9,652 kg) ♥ 9 LT 18 cwt (10,060 kg)
  - Tender bogie: Bogie 1: ♣ 20 LT 1 cwt (20,370 kg) ♦ 21 LT 14 cwt (22,050 kg); Bogie 2: ♣ 20 LT 10 cwt (20,830 kg) ♦ 21 LT 16 cwt (22,150 kg)
  - Tender axle: ♣ 10 LT 5 cwt (10,410 kg) ♦ 10 LT 18 cwt (11,070 kg)
- Adhesive weight: ♠ 58 LT 18 cwt (59,850 kg) ♥ 60 LT 10 cwt (61,470 kg)
- Loco weight: ♠ 93 LT (94,490 kg) ♥ 84 LT 12 cwt (85,960 kg)
- Tender weight: ♣ 40 LT 11 cwt (41,200 kg) ♦ 43 LT 10 cwt (44,200 kg)
- Total weight: ♠♣ 133 LT 11 cwt (135,700 kg) ♠♦ 136 LT 10 cwt (138,700 kg) ♥♣ 125 LT 3 cwt (127,200 kg) ♥♦ 128 LT 1 cwt (130,100 kg)
- Tender type: TJ (2-axle bogies) – 1446–1450; TM (2-axle bogies) – 1451–1475; TJ, TL, TM permitted
- Fuel type: Coal
- Fuel capacity: ♣ 6 LT (6.1 t) ♦ 8 LT 5 cwt (8.4 t)
- Water cap.: ♣ 3,500 imp gal (15,900 L) ♦ 4,000 imp gal (18,200 L)
- Firebox
  - Type: ♠ Belpaire ♥ Round-top
  - Grate area: ♠ 34 sq ft (3.2 m^{2}) ♥ 37 sq ft (3.4 m^{2})
- Boiler
  - Type: ♥ Watson Standard no. 2
  - Pitch: ♠ 7 ft 4 in (2,235 mm) ♥ 7 ft 5 1/2 in (2,273 mm)
  - Diameter: ♠ 5 ft 6 1/8 in (1,680 mm) ♥ 5 ft 7 1/2 in (1,714 mm)
  - Tube plates: ♠ 18 ft 6 in (5,639 mm) ♥ 19 ft 4 in (5,893 mm) steel f/b 19 ft 3 5/8 in (5,883 mm) copper f/b
  - Small tubes: ♠ 237: tubes 2 1/4 in (57 mm) ♥ 87: 2 1/2 in (64 mm)
  - Large tubes: ♥ 30: 5 1/2 in (140 mm)
- Boiler pressure: 190 psi (1,310 kPa)
- Safety valve: ♠ Ramsbottom ♥ Pop
- Heating surface
  - Firebox: ♠ 139 sq ft (12.9 m^{2}) ♥ 142 sq ft (13.2 m^{2})
  - Tubes: ♠ 2,582 sq ft (239.9 m^{2}) ♥ 1,933 sq ft (179.6 m^{2})
  - Total surface: ♠ 2,721 sq ft (252.8 m^{2}) ♥ 2,075 sq ft (192.8 m^{2})
- Superheater
  - Heating area: ♥ 434 sq ft (40.3 m^{2})
- Cylinders: Two
- Cylinder size: 21 in (533 mm) bore 24 in (610 mm) stroke
- Valve gear: Walschaerts
- Valve type: Murdoch's D slide
- Couplers: Johnston link-and-pin AAR knuckle (1930s)
Performance figures
- Tractive effort: ♠ 34,890 lbf (155.2 kN) @ 75% ♥ 32,790 lbf (145.9 kN) @ 75%
Career
- Operators: Natal Government Railways; South African Railways
- Class: NGR Class B SAR Classes 3 & 3R
- Number in class: 30
- Numbers: NGR 330–334, 345–369; SAR 1446–1475
- Nicknames: Hendrie D
- Delivered: 1909, 1911
- First run: 1909
- Withdrawn: 1974
- The leading coupled axle had flangeless wheels

The South African Railways Class 3 4-8-2 of 1909 was a steam locomotive from the pre-Union era in the Colony of Natal.

In 1909, the Natal Government Railways placed the world's first true Mountain type locomotive in service when five Class B 4-8-2 tender locomotives were commissioned. Another 25 were placed in service in 1911. In 1912, when they were assimilated into the South African Railways, they were renumbered and designated Class 3. The Mountain wheel arrangement went on to become the most numerous steam locomotive wheel configuration in use in South Africa.

== Manufacturer ==
With increasing coal traffic in Natal, the demand arose for more powerful locomotives. The Class B of 1909, also known as the Hendrie D, was a heavy 4-8-2 locomotive, designed by Natal Government Railways (NGR) Locomotive Superintendent D.A. Hendrie. They entered service in October 1909 and were put to work to handle coal traffic on the upper Natal mainline.

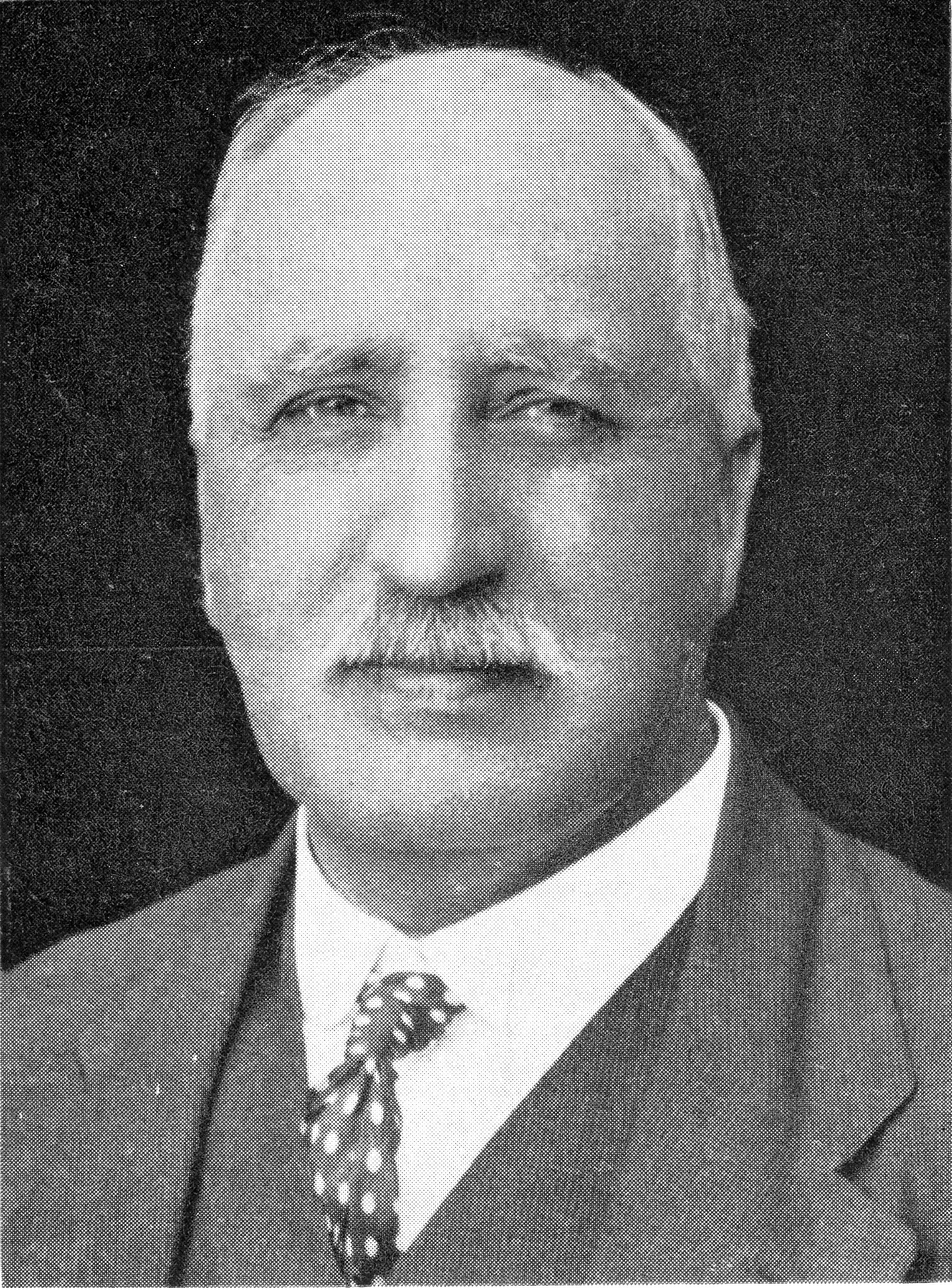
D.A. Hendrie

The locomotive design was based on Hendrie's Class B 4-8-0 in its modified form of 1906 as the Altered Hendrie B 4-8-2. This time, however, Hendrie made full use of the potential of the pony truck under the cab to carry additional weight by positioning the firebox to the rear of the driving wheels, which made an improved grate and ashpan possible. To accomplish this, the plate frame was equipped with a bridle casting at the rear to accommodate the larger firebox. Five locomotives were built by the North British Locomotive Company (NBL) and delivered in 1909, numbered in the range from 330 to 334.

The first five locomotives were delivered with the first Type TJ tenders, which had a 6 long tons (6.1 tonnes) coal and 3,500 imperial gallons (15,900 litres) water capacity. They were put to work between Estcourt and Charlestown on the Transvaal border, where they regularly hauled loads of 225 long tons (229 tonnes), as well as fast perishable goods traffic. They proved to be highly successful in use, which led to an order for another 25 locomotives from NBL in 1910. These were delivered in 1911 and numbered in the range from 345 to 369 on the NGR roster. They were identical to the first batch of engines in all respects, except that they had Type TM tenders, which had an 8 long tons 5 hundredweight (8.4 tonnes) coal and 4,000 imperial gallons (18,200 litres) water capacity.

== Characteristics ==
The locomotives were equipped with Pyle National Electric headlights. They were the world's first true Mountain type tender locomotives, having been designed and built with a 4-8-2 wheel arrangement with the firebox positioned to the rear of the driving wheels. Earlier Natal 4-8-2 locomotives were modified from a different original wheel arrangement.

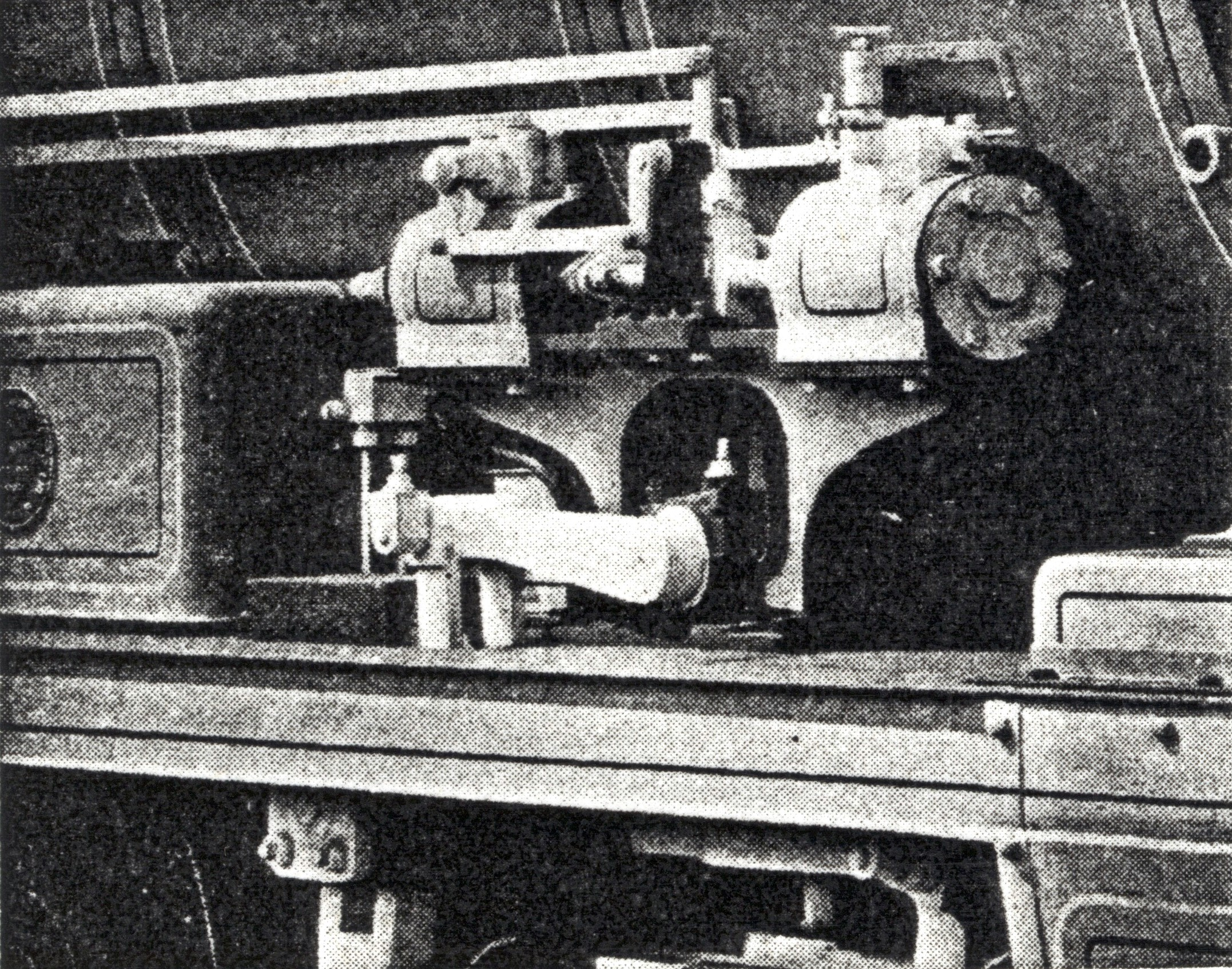
Hendrie's steam reversing gear

The boilers which were used on these locomotives were, at the time, the largest in South Africa. Like the altered NGR Class B of 1906 on which it was based, these locomotives used saturated steam and had plate frames. They used Walschaerts valve gear with flat "D" gunmetal type valves, which were arranged above the cylinders and controlled by the Hendrie-designed steam reversing gear. Since they were built without superheaters, the bore of their slide valves were 1/2 inch (12.7 millimetres) larger than those on the altered Class B of 1906 to compensate for the additional weight of the locomotive.

The boiler, of which the barrel was 11/16 inch (17 millimetres) thick, was fitted with four Ramsbottom safety valves, 3 1/2 inches (89 millimetres) in diameter. It was fed by two injectors, arranged on the underside of the footplate at the sides, with the combination valves placed on the back of the firebox. The Belpaire firebox was constructed with a forward "rake" of the throat and back plates to keep the distance between the boiler's tube plates reasonably short at 18 feet 6 inches (5,639 millimetres). It had a finger bar firegrate which was operated by hand lever from the cab.

== South African Railways ==
When the Union of South Africa was established on 31 May 1910, the three Colonial government railways (Cape Government Railways, NGR and Central South African Railways) were united under a single administration to control and administer the railways, ports and harbours of the Union. Although the South African Railways and Harbours came into existence in 1910 with Sir William Hoy appointed as its first General Manager, the actual classification and renumbering of all the rolling stock of the three constituent railways were only implemented with effect from 1 January 1912.

Obsolete locomotives included, altogether 1,460 engines of 70 different types had to be classified and renumbered. Prior to Union, locomotive designs for the constituent railways primarily had to meet local requirements since there had been no through running of engines between them. Union required a more general policy, even though local characteristics such as severity of gradients and curvature and permissible axle loads would never make it possible to produce a standard type of locomotive which would be capable of meeting all requirements. Nevertheless, standardisation was necessary on the new South African Railways (SAR) and Hoy estimated that fifteen standard locomotive types would be sufficient to cover all the varying conditions.

In March 1911, one of these new NGR locomotives, no. 368 of the 1911 batch, was used during comparative testing between locomotives of the constituent railways. It was brought up from Natal for testing against the Class 11 on the Witbank-Germiston coal line. The maximum load worked by the Class 11 was 900 short tons (816 tonnes), while the Natal locomotive was able to manage 1,246 short tons (1,130 tonnes) at practically the same coal consumption.

In 1912, these thirty Class B locomotives were renumbered in the range from 1446 to 1475 and designated Class 3 on the SAR.

== Watson Standard boilers ==
In the 1930s, many serving locomotives were reboilered with a standard boiler type, designed by then Chief Mechanical Engineer A.G. Watson, as part of his standardisation policy. Such Watson Standard reboilered locomotives were reclassified by adding an "R" suffix to their classification number.

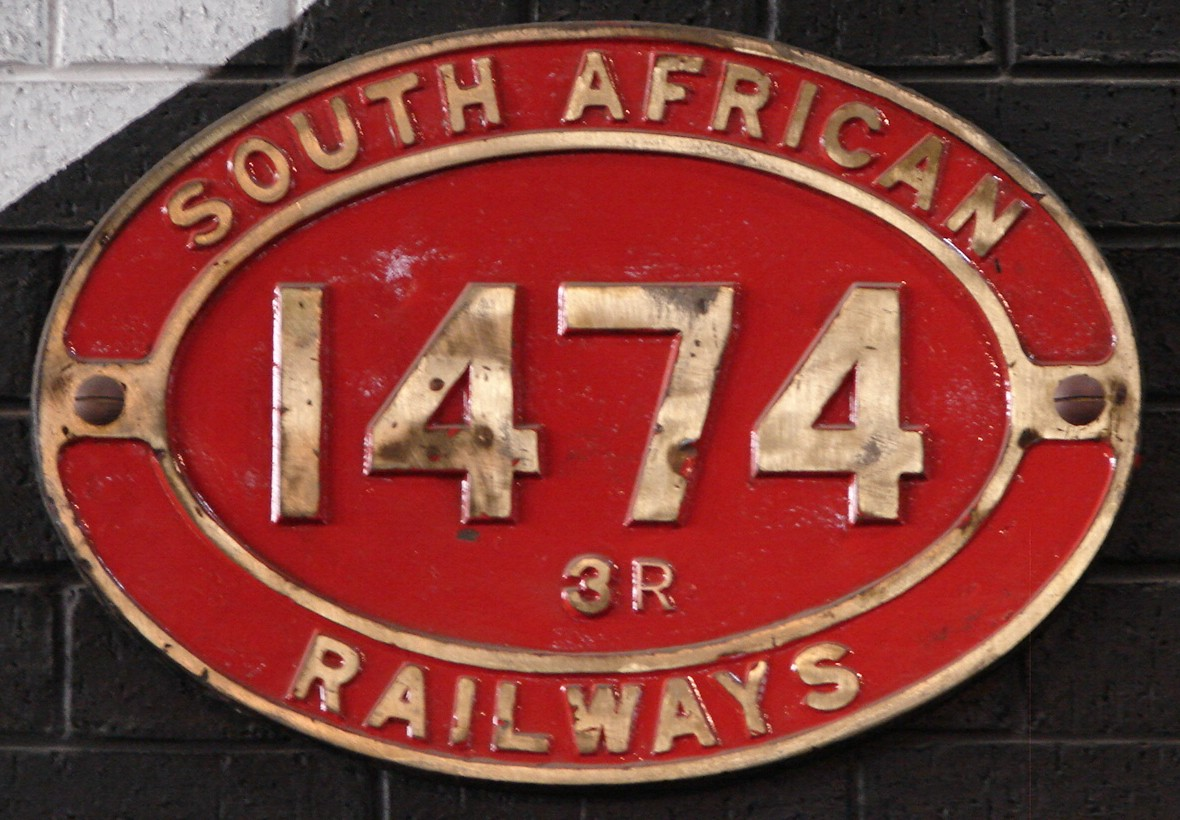

When 29 of the Class 3 locomotives, all except no. 1457, were eventually reboilered with superheated Watson Standard no. 2 boilers, they were therefore reclassified to Class 3R. Their original Belpaire boilers were fitted with Ramsbottom safety valves, while the Watson Standard boilers were fitted with Pop safety valves. The most obvious visual difference between an original and a Watson Standard reboilered locomotive is usually a rectangular regulator cover on the smokebox of the reboilered locomotive just to the rear of the chimney, but this was not always the case, as illustrated below. In the case of the Class 3R locomotive, an even more obvious visual distinction is the absence of the Belpaire firebox hump between the cab and the boiler.

Locomotives usually had their slide valves replaced with piston valves upon being fitted with superheated Watson Standard boilers, but the Class 3R retained their slide valves throughout their working lives.

By the late 1960s, towards the end of their service lives, the Class 3 was distributed between the Orange Free State and the Cape Western systems. By this time, they were all used on shunting and pickup service, mainly around Bloemfontein, Beaufort West, Touws River and Cape Town. By 1970, the entire Class was concentrated in the Cape Western region. Despite their small 45 1/2 inches (1,156 millimetres) coupled wheels, they could handle 50 miles per hour (80 kilometres per hour) with ease and became the preferred power for Bellville haulers until the Class 14CRB took over this service. The Class 3 were finally withdrawn from service in 1974.

== Works numbers and renumbering ==
The Class 3 works numbers, years built, numbering and SAR classification are listed in the table.

NGR Class B 4-8-2 of 1909 SAR Class 3 and 3R 4-8-2
Works no.	Year built	NGR no.	SAR no.	SAR Class
18829	1909	330	1446	3R
18830	1909	331	1447	3R
18831	1909	332	1448	3R
18832	1909	333	1449	3R
18833	1909	334	1450	3R
19217	1910	345	1451	3R
19218	1910	346	1452	3R
19219	1910	347	1453	3R
19220	1910	348	1454	3R
19221	1910	349	1455	3R
19222	1910	350	1456	3R
19223	1910	351	1457	3
19224	1910	352	1458	3R
19225	1910	353	1459	3R
19226	1910	354	1460	3R
19227	1910	355	1461	3R
19228	1910	356	1462	3R
19229	1910	357	1463	3R
19230	1910	358	1464	3R
19231	1910	359	1465	3R
19232	1910	360	1466	3R
19233	1910	361	1467	3R
19234	1910	362	1468	3R
19235	1910	363	1469	3R
19236	1910	364	1470	3R
19237	1910	365	1471	3R
19238	1910	366	1472	3R
19239	1910	367	1473	3R
19240	1910	368	1474	3R
19241	1910	369	1475	3R

== Preservation ==
One Class 3 has survived into preservation.

Number	Works nmr	THF / Private	Leaselend / Owner	Current Location	Outside SOUTH AFRICA	?
1474		THF	Transnet Heritage Foundation	Bloemfontein Locomotive Depot		

== Illustration ==
The main picture shows NGR Class B no. 334, later SAR Class 3R no. 1450, as built with a Belpaire firebox and Type TJ tender. Both of the following pictures show Watson Standard reboilered Class 3R locomotives with modified Type TJ tenders. The first has the usual spotting feature of a Watson Standard reboilered locomotive, the rectangular regulator cover just to the rear of the chimney, while the second has a bolted on cover plate instead, flush with the smokebox top.

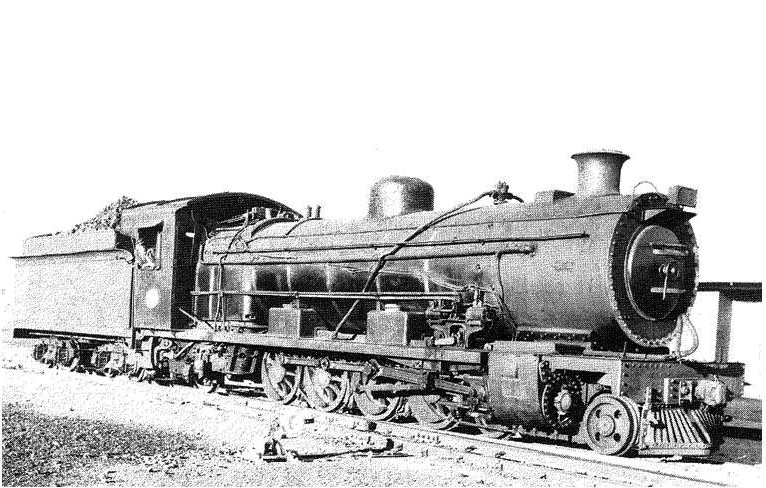
Reboilered Class 3R with the rectangular regulator cover, c. 1970

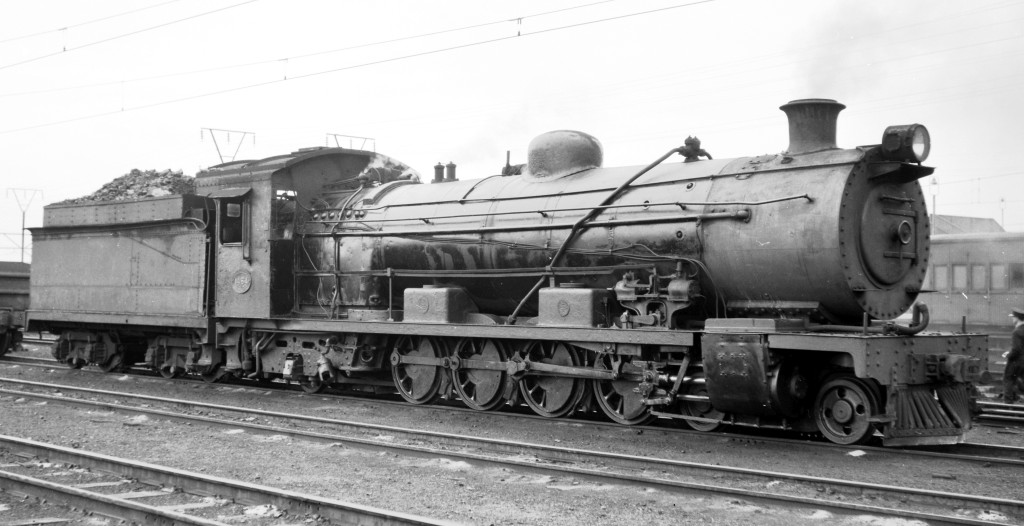
Reboilered Class 3R no. 1464 without the rectangular regulator cover, at Paardeneiland on 26 June 1962
