= Slide valve =

Type of rectilinear valve

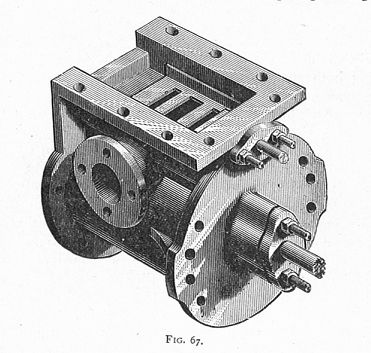
Cylinder, with slide valve removed to show ports

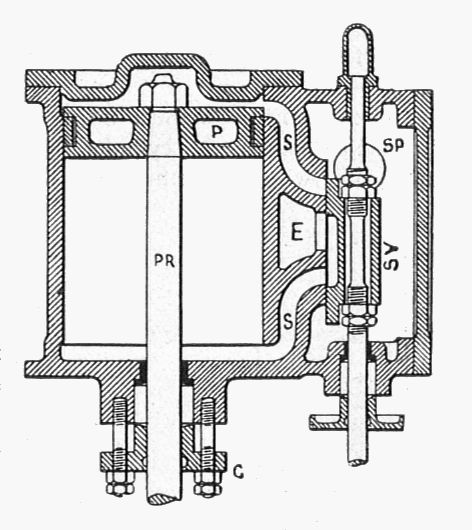
A double-acting slide valve cylinder. Steam enters via the steam port SP, and is admitted by the slide valve SV through the upper passage S to push down the piston P. At the same time, exhaust steam from below the piston passes back up the lower passage S, via the valve cavity, to exhaust E. As the piston descends, the valve moves upwards to admit steam below the piston and release exhaust from above.

The slide valve is a rectilinear valve used to control the admission of steam into and emission of exhaust from the cylinder of a steam engine.

The image description page explains how this SVG animation can be viewed

== Use ==
In the 19th century, most steam locomotives used slide valves to control the flow of steam into and out of the cylinders. In the 20th century, slide valves were gradually superseded by piston valves, particularly in engines using superheated steam. There were two reasons for this:

- With piston valves, the steam passages can be made shorter. This reduces resistance to the flow of steam and improves efficiency.
- It is difficult to lubricate slide valves adequately in the presence of superheated steam.

== Murdoch's D slide valve ==
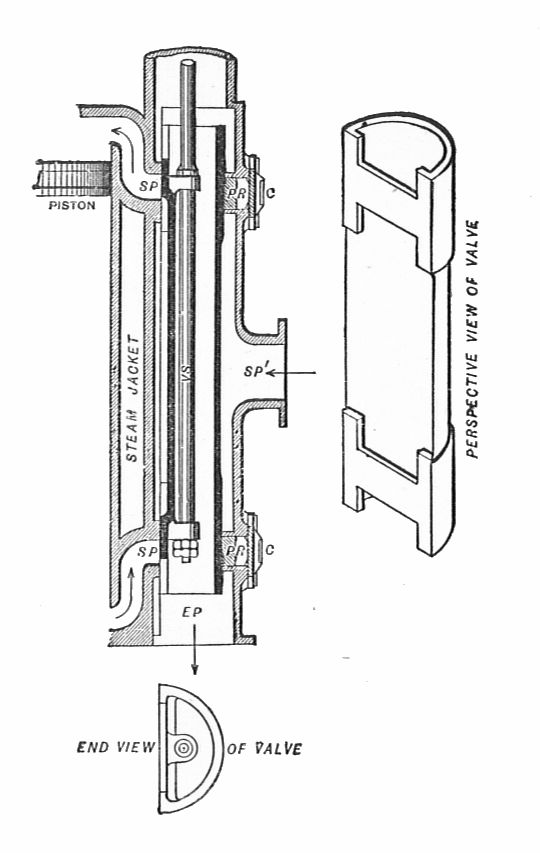
Murdoch's long D slide valve

The D slide valve, or more specifically long D slide valve, is a form of slide valve, invented by William Murdoch and patented in 1799. It is named after the hollow central D-sectioned piston.

This valve worked by "connecting the upper and lower valves so as to be worked by one rod or spindle, and in making the stem or tube which connects them hollow, so as to serve for an induction pipe to the upper end of the cylinder." This allowed two valves to do the work of four.

The above description (referring to upper and lower valves) clearly relates to an engine with a vertical cylinder, such as a beam engine. Where the cylinders are horizontal, as in a steam locomotive, the valves would be side-by-side.

== Balanced slide valve ==
The balanced slide valve was invented by the Scottish engineer Alexander Allan. It was not much used in the UK but, at one time, had great popularity in the United States. It gave some of the advantages of a piston valve to a slide valve by relieving the pressure on the back of the valve, thus reducing friction and wear.

== See also ==
- Corliss valve
- Piston valve
- Poppet valve
- Sleeve valve
- Steam locomotive nomenclature
- Valve gear
