= 1906 in South Africa =

- Decades: 1880s; 1890s; 1900s; 1910s; 1920s
- See also: 1906 in South African sport; List of years in South Africa

The following lists events that happened during 1906 in South Africa.

== Incumbents ==
- Governor of the Cape of Good Hope and High Commissioner for Southern Africa:Walter Hely-Hutchinson.
- Governor of the Colony of Natal: Henry Edward McCallum.
- Prime Minister of the Cape of Good Hope: Leander Starr Jameson.
- Prime Minister of the Orange River Colony: William Palmer, 2nd Earl of Selborne.
- Prime Minister of the Colony of Natal: Charles John Smythe (until 28 November), Frederick Robert Moor (starting 28 November).

== Events ==
February

- 11 – Two British £1-per-head tax collectors are killed near Richmond, sparking the Bambatha Rebellion led by Chief Bambatha kaMancinza, leader of the amaZondi clan of the Zulu people.

May

- 2 – Lord Alfred Milner, British colonial secretary and the High Commissioner for Southern Africa, returns to Britain.
- 6 – British troops kill over 60 Zulu warriors during a punitive expedition near Durban.
- A statue of Paul Kruger is unveiled in Church Square, Pretoria

June

- The first issue of the Annals of the Natal Government Museum (currently African Invertebrates) is published by Natal Museum in Pietermaritzburg, South Africa.

Unknown date

- Tuberculosis reaches epidemic proportions in South Africa.

== Births ==
- 6 January – Walter Battiss, artist, is born in Somerset East (d. 1982)
- 5 March – Siegfried Mynhardt, actor, is born in Johannesburg. (d. 1996)
- 11 June – N.P. van Wyk Louw, poet, dramatist and essayist, is born in Sutherland, Cape Colony. (d. 1970)
- 30 October – Archibald Campbell Mzoliza Jordan, Xhosa writer and linguist, is born near Tsolo in the Cape Colony.
- 13 December – Laurens van der Post, author, farmer, war hero, political adviser, educator, journalist, humanitarian, philosopher, explorer and conservationist, is born in Philippolis. (d. 1996)

== Railways ==
=== Railway lines opened ===
- Transvaal – Nancefield to Pimville, 2 miles (3.2 kilometres).
- 22 January – Cape Central – Riversdale to Voorbaai, 58 miles (93.3 kilometres).
- 6 February – Free State – Jagersfontein to Fauresmith, 8 miles 23 chains (13.3 kilometres).
- 1 April – Cape Midland – Port Elizabeth to Humewood Road (Narrow gauge), 75 chains (1.5 kilometres).
- 6 April – Transvaal – Orkney to Fourteen Streams, 135 miles (217.3 kilometres).
- 16 May – Natal – Donnybrook to Creighton, 15 miles 3 chains (24.2 kilometres).
- 1 June – Natal – Ennersdale to Loskop, 12 miles 75 chains (20.8 kilometres).
- 21 June – Free State – Bethlehem to Kroonstad, 90 miles 15 chains (145.1 kilometres).
- 21 June – Transvaal – Pienaarsrivier to Settlers (Regauged), 26 miles 62 chains (43.1 kilometres).

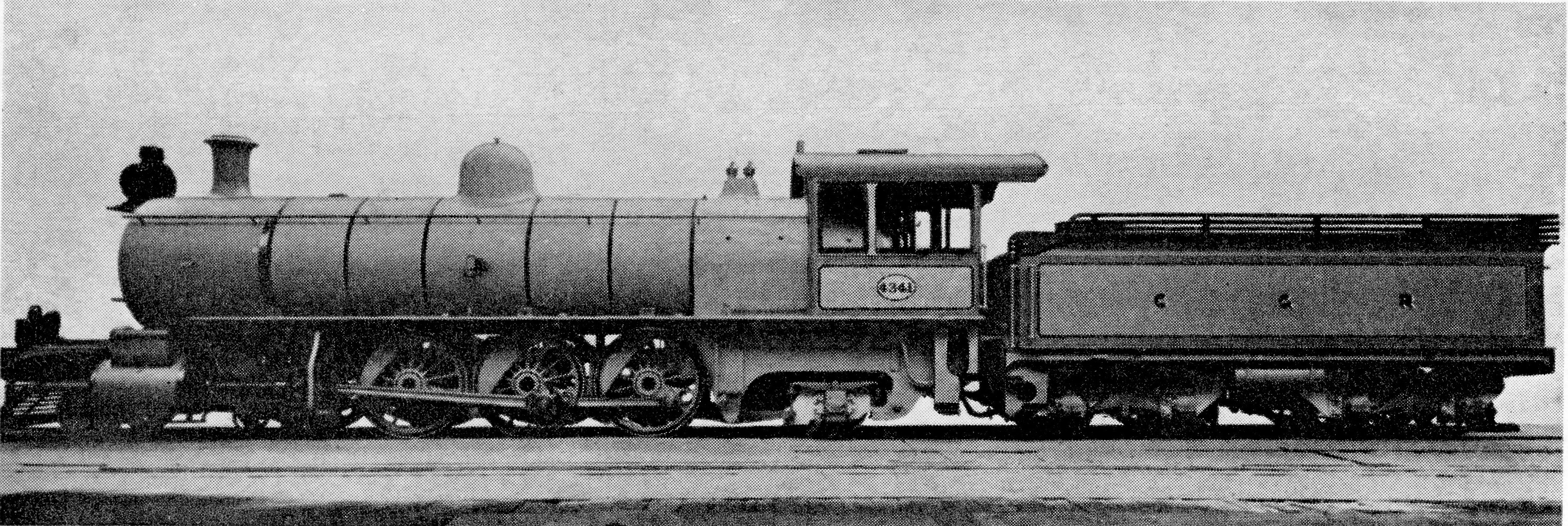
CGR 9th Class

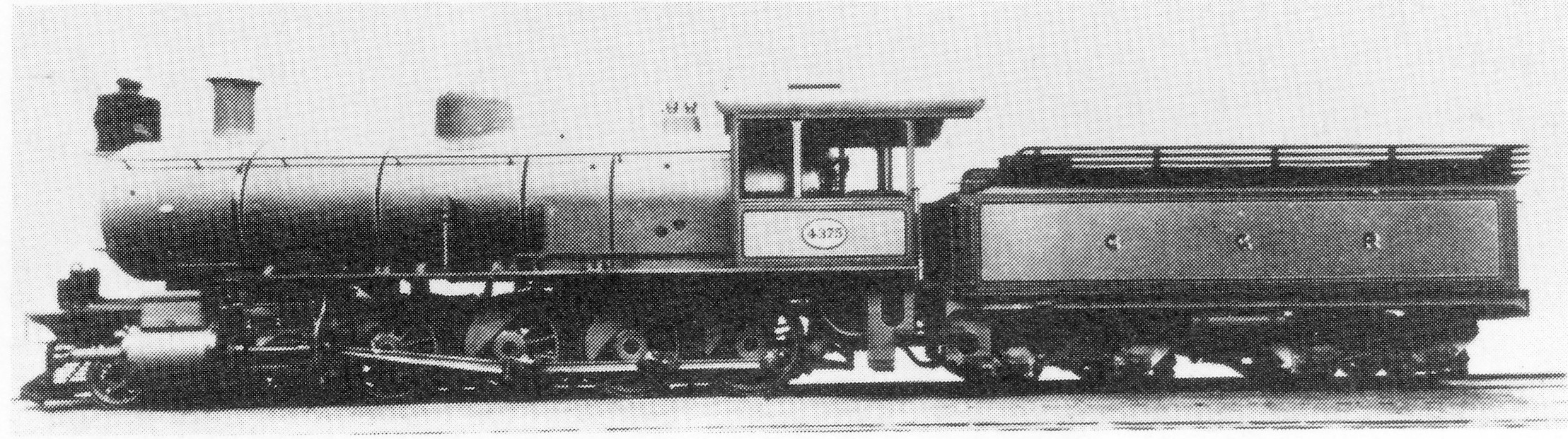
CGR 10th Class

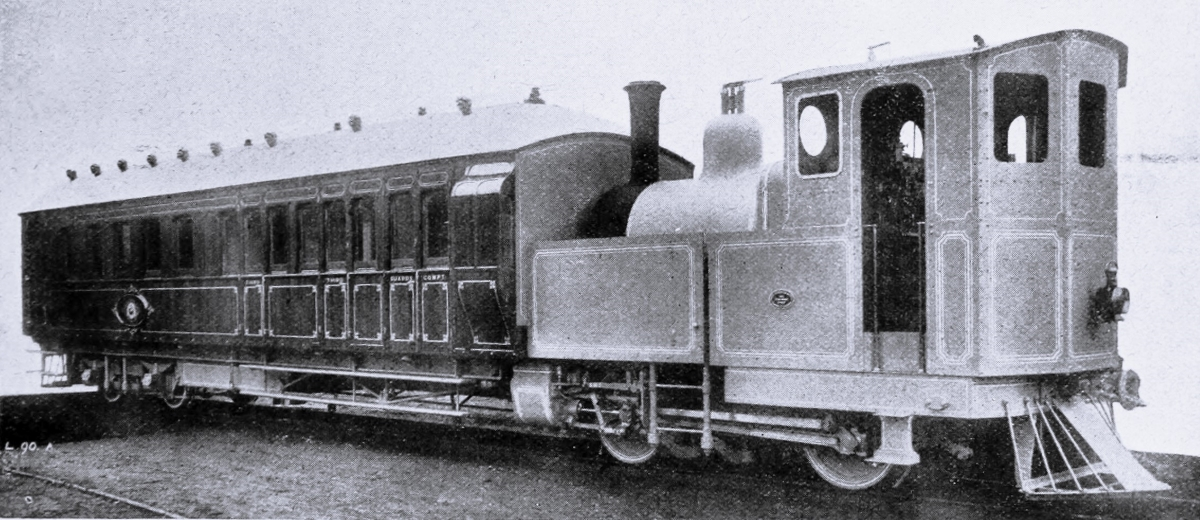
CGR Railmotor

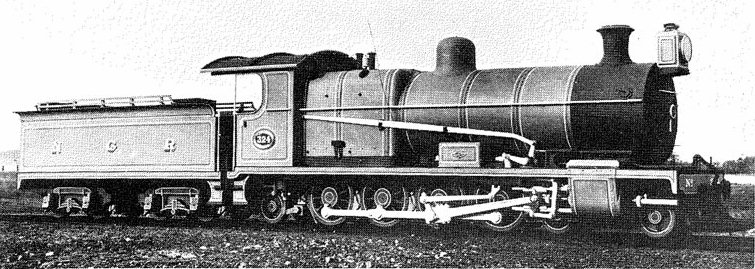
NGR Class B

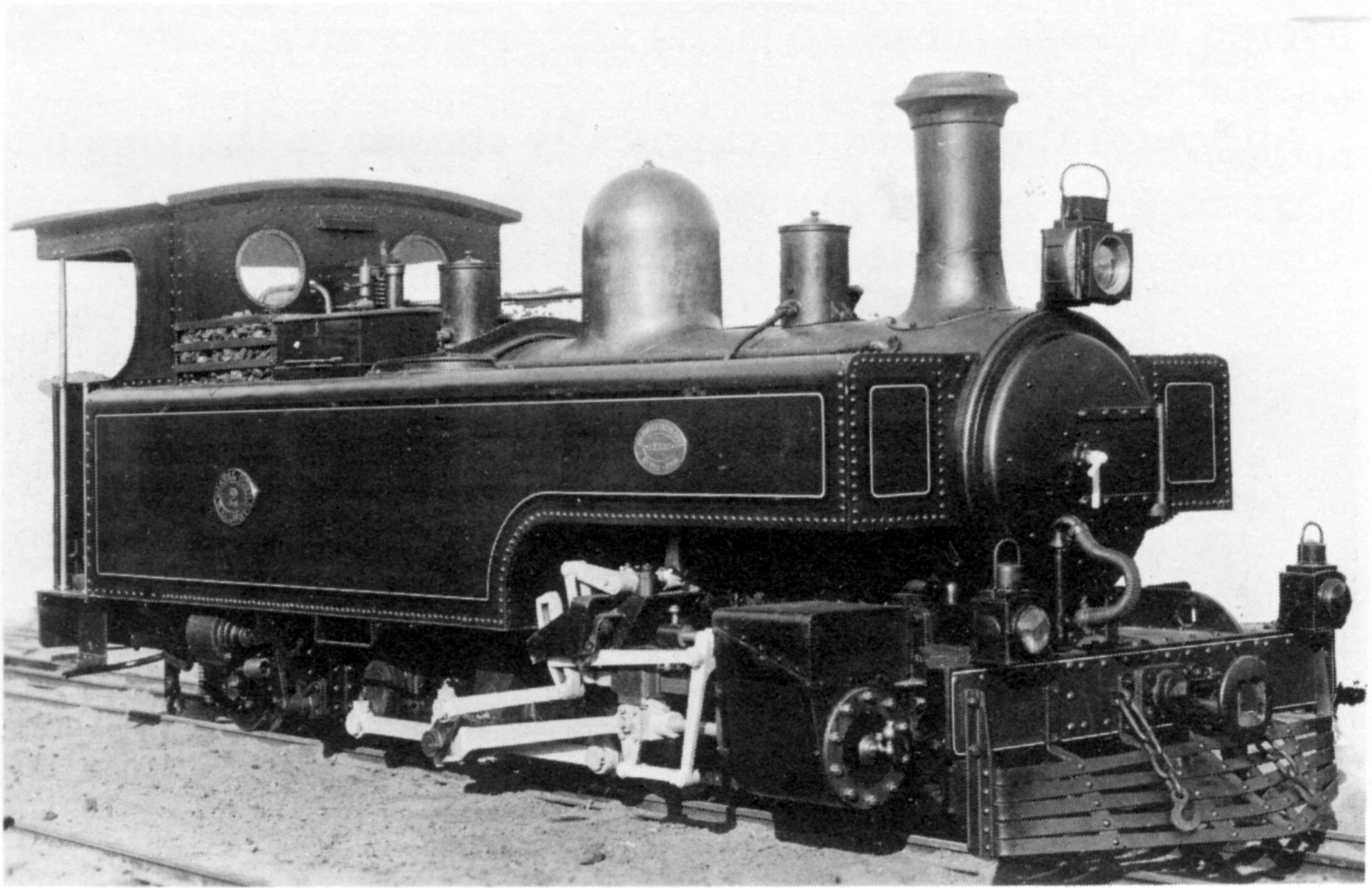
NGR Class N

- 1 August – Cape Western – Pampoenpoort to Carnarvon, 37 miles 27 chains (60.1 kilometres).
- 29 August – Cape Eastern – Elliot to Maclear, 54 miles 51 chains (87.9 kilometres).
- 1 December – Cape Midland – Humansdorp to Misgund (Narrow gauge), 86 miles 20 chains (138.8 kilometres).
- 15 December – Cape Midland – Valley Junction to Walmer (Narrow gauge), 3 miles 40 chains (5.6 kilometres).
- 17 December – Cape Eastern – Eagle to Butterworth, 22 miles 79 chains (37.0 kilometres).
- 26 December – Transvaal – Apex to Witbank, 69 miles 49 chains (112.0 kilometres).
- 27 December – Transvaal – Pretoria North to Rustenburg, 60 miles 34 chains (97.2 kilometres).

=== Locomotives ===
Cape

- The Cape Government Railways places three locomotives in service, two of them experimental.
  - An experimental 9th Class 2-8-2 Mikado steam locomotive. In 1912 it will be designated Class Experimental 5 on the South African Railways (SAR).
  - An experimental 10th Class 4-8-0 Mastodon locomotive for the Cape Eastern System. In 1912 it will be designated Class Experimental 6 on the SAR.
  - A single self-contained Railmotor for low-volume passenger service on the Franschhoek branchline.

Natal

- The Natal Government Railways (NGR) modifies six of its 4-8-0 Class B locomotives to a 4-8-2 wheel arrangement, the first 4-8-2 Mountain type tender locomotive in the world. In 1912 it will be designated Class 1B on the South African Railways (SAR).
- In April the NGR places two Class N 4-6-2 narrow gauge tank locomotives in service on the new narrow gauge line that is being built between Estcourt and Weenen.
