= Natal Government Railways Class N locomotives =

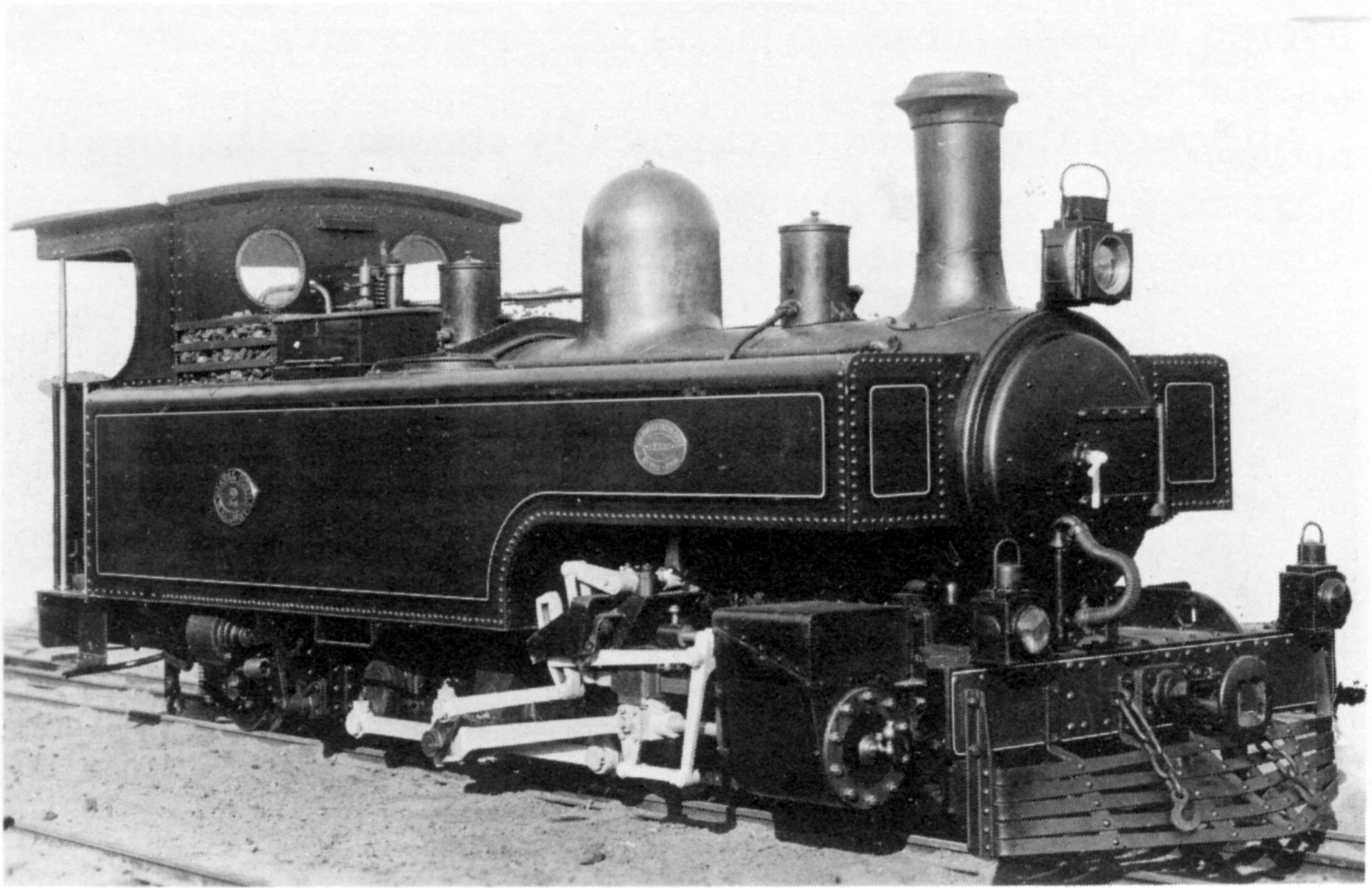
NGR Class N 4-6-2T of 1906

The Natal Government Railways Class N locomotives include three different narrow gauge locomotive types, all designated Class N.

When the Union of South Africa was established on 31 May 1910, the three Colonial government railways (Cape Government Railways, Natal Government Railways and Central South African Railways) were united under a single administration to control and administer the railways, ports and harbours of the Union. In 1912, the NGR Class N locomotives were not classified by the South African Railways (SAR), but had the letters "NG", for narrow gauge, prefixed to their existing engine numbers. They remained unclassified on the SAR until a classification system for narrow gauge locomotives was adopted in the late 1920s, after some of them had already been withdrawn from service.

- NGR Class N 4-6-2T of 1906
- NGR Class N 4-6-2T of 1907 (SAR Class NG3)
- NGR Class N 4-6-2T of 1911 (SAR Class NG4)
