= South African Class 1 locomotives =

South African Class 1 4-8-0 may refer to one of the following steam locomotive classes:

- South African Class 1 4-8-0, as built.
- South African Class 1A 4-8-0.
- South African Class 1B 4-8-2, modified back to a 4-8-0 wheel arrangement.
