= South African type SH tender =

Steam locomotive tender

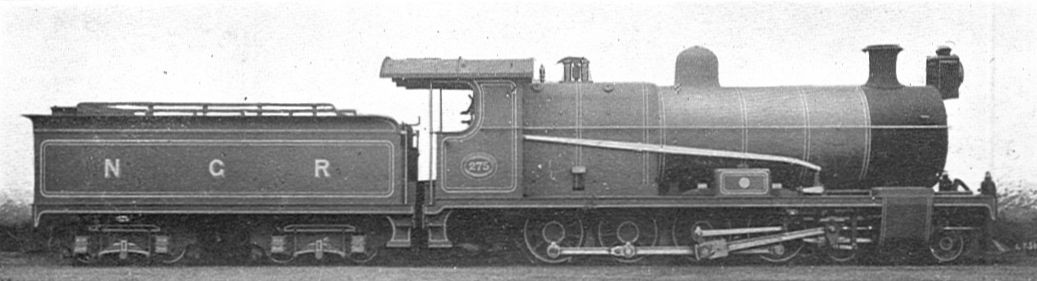
- Type SH tender on NGR Class B of 1904
Type and origin
- Locomotive: NGR Class A of 1905; NGR Class B of 1904; NGR Class B of 1906
- Designer: Natal Government Railways (D.A. Hendrie)
- Builder: North British Locomotive Company
- In service: 1904-1905
- Rebuilder: South African Railways
- Rebuild date: c. 1925
- Rebuilt to: Type SK
Specifications
- Configuration: 2-axle bogies
- Gauge: 3 ft 6 in (1,067 mm) Cape gauge
- Length: 22 ft 9 3/16 in (6,939 mm)
- Wheel dia.: 30 in (762 mm)
- Wheelbase: 15 ft 6 in (4,724 mm)
  - Bogie: 4 ft 6 in (1,372 mm)
- Axle load: 9 LT 10 cwt 2 qtr (9,678 kg)
  - Front bogie: 18 LT 18 cwt (19,200 kg)
  - Rear bogie: 19 LT 1 cwt (19,360 kg)
- Weight empty: 39,318 lb (17,834 kg)
- Weight w/o: 37 LT 19 cwt (38,560 kg)
- Fuel type: Coal
- Fuel cap.: 6 LT (6.1 t)
- Water cap.: 3,225 imp gal (14,700 L)
- Stoking: Manual
- Couplers: Drawbar & Johnston link-and-pin Drawbar & AAR knuckle (1930s)
Career
- Operators: Natal Government Railways; South African Railways
- Numbers: SAR 762-763, 1245-1288, 1440-1445

The South African type SH tender was a steam locomotive tender from the pre-Union era in the Natal Colony.

The Type SH tender first entered service in 1904, as tenders to the Class B 4-8-0 Mastodon type steam locomotives which were acquired by the Natal Government Railways in that year. These locomotives were designated Class 1 on the South African Railways in 1912.

== Manufacturer ==
Type SH tenders were built in 1904 by the North British Locomotive Company.

The Natal Government Railways (NGR) placed fifty Class B Mastodon type locomotives in service in 1904. The locomotive and tender were designed by NGR Locomotive Superintendent D.A. Hendrie. Known as the Hendrie B, the first tender locomotive to enter service on the NGR in quantity, it replaced the NGR's fleet of tank locomotives on mainline working. The Type SH tender first entered service as tenders to these locomotives.

In 1906, six of the Hendrie B engines were modified to a 4-8-2 Mountain type wheel arrangement.

== Characteristics ==
As built, the tender had a coal capacity of 6 long tons (6.1 tonnes) and a water capacity of 3,225 imperial gallons (14,700 litres), with a maximum axle load of 9 long tons 10 hundredweight 2 quarters (9,678 kilograms).

== Locomotives ==
Apart from those delivered with the Class B Mastodon type locomotives, more Type SH tenders entered service in 1905 as tenders to the NGR Class A Pacific type locomotive, or Hendrie A.

In the South African Railways (SAR) years, tenders were numbered for the engines they were delivered with. In most cases, an oval number plate, bearing the engine number and often also the tender type, would be attached to the rear end of the tender. During the classification and renumbering of locomotives onto the SAR roster in 1912, no separate classification and renumbering list was published for tenders, which should have been renumbered according to the locomotive renumbering list.

The SAR grouped and renumbered the Hendrie A and Hendrie B locomotives into three separate Classes, according to wheel arrangement. Bearing in mind that tenders could and did migrate between engines, the Type SH tenders should have been numbered in the number ranges as shown.

- 1904: NGR Class B 4-8-0, SAR Class 1, numbers 1245 to 1288.
- 1904: NGR Class B 4-8-2, SAR Class 1B, numbers 1440 to 1445.
- 1905: NGR Class A 4-6-2, SAR Class 2, numbers 762 and 763.

== Classification letters ==
Since many tender types are interchangeable between different locomotive classes and types, a tender classification system was adopted by the SAR. The first letter of the tender type indicates the classes of engines to which it could be coupled. The "S_" tenders could only be used with the three locomotive classes with which they had been delivered.

The second letter indicates the tender's water capacity. The "_H" tenders had a capacity of 3,225 imperial gallons (14,700 litres; 3,870 US gallons).

== Modifications and rebuilding ==
=== Modifications ===
The original slatted upper sides of the Type SH tender's coal bunker were soon replaced by sheet-metal sides. The sheet-metal tops appear to have not been uniform in dimensions, with some extending further towards the rear end of the tender than others.

=== Rebuilding to Type SK ===
From c. 1925, several of the Type SH tenders were completely rebuilt by the SAR by mounting a new upper structure on the existing underframe, with larger water tanks and a larger coal capacity. These rebuilt tenders had a more modern appearance, with smooth sides all the way to the top of the coal bunker. They were designated Type SK.

The program to rebuild several older tender types with new upper structures was begun by Col F.R. Collins DSO, who approved several of the detailed drawings for the work during his term in office as Chief Mechanical Engineer of the SAR from 1922 to 1929. It was continued by his successor, A.G. Watson.

== Illustration ==
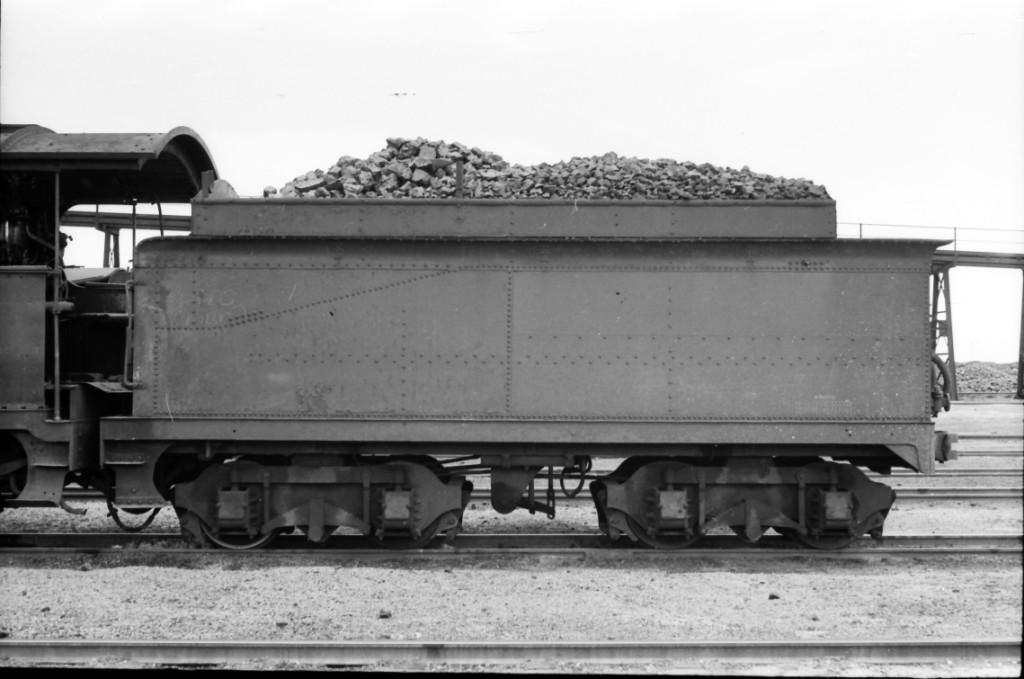
Modified Type SH with shorter upper sides, c. 1970

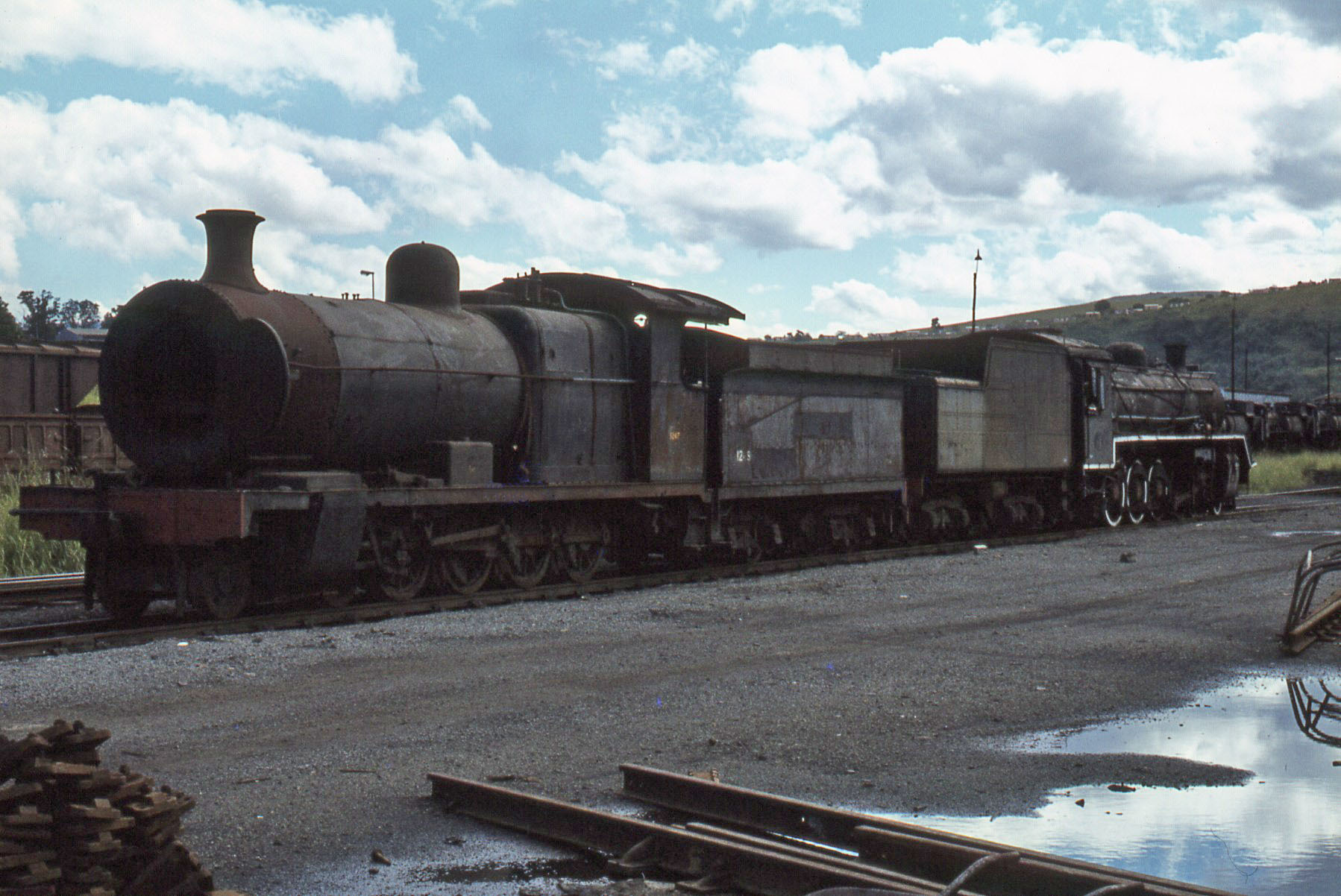
Modified Type SH with longer upper sides on Class 1, 1979
