= South African Class 2 4-6-2 =

1905 design of steam locomotive

NGR Class A 4-6-2 1905 South African Class 2 4-6-2
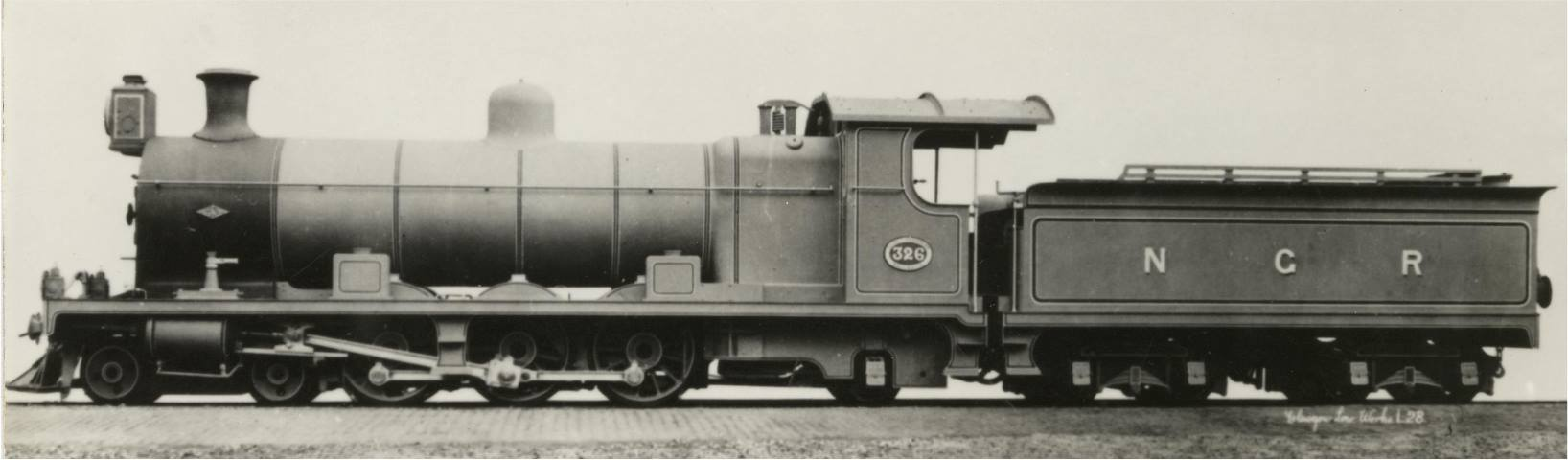
- NGR Class A no. 326, SAR Class 2 no. 763
Type and origin
- Power type: Steam
- Designer: Natal Government Railways (D.A. Hendrie)
- Builder: North British Locomotive Company
- Serial number: 16192-16193
- Model: NGR Hendrie A
- Build date: 1904
- Total produced: 2
Specifications
- Configuration
  - Whyte: 4-6-2 (Pacific)
  - UIC: 2'C1'n2
- Driver: 2nd coupled axle
- Gauge: 3 ft 6 in (1,067 mm) Cape gauge
- Leading dia.: 28 1/2 in (724 mm)
- Coupled dia.: 51 in (1,295 mm)
- Trailing dia.: 30 in (762 mm)
- Tender wheels: 30 in (762 mm)
- Wheelbase: 51 ft 1 3/8 in (15,580 mm)
  - Engine: 27 ft 10 in (8,484 mm)
  - Leading: 6 ft (1,829 mm)
  - Coupled: 9 ft 4 in (2,845 mm)
  - Tender: 15 ft 6 in (4,724 mm)
  - Tender bogie: 4 ft 6 in (1,372 mm)
- Length
  - Over couplers: 58 ft 4 1/8 in (17,783 mm)
- Height: 12 ft 6 in (3,810 mm)
- Frame type: Plate
- Axle load: 15 LT (15,240 kg)
  - Leading: 11 LT 15 cwt (11,940 kg)
  - 1st coupled: 14 LT (14,220 kg)
  - 2nd coupled: 15 LT (15,240 kg)
  - 3rd coupled: 14 LT 15 cwt (14,990 kg)
  - Trailing: 10 LT 16 cwt (10,970 kg)
  - Tender bogie: Bogie 1: 18 LT 18 cwt (19,200 kg); Bogie 2: 19 LT 1 cwt (19,360 kg)
  - Tender axle: 9 LT 10 cwt 2 qtr (9,678 kg)
- Adhesive weight: 43 LT 15 cwt (44,450 kg)
- Loco weight: 66 LT 6 cwt (67,360 kg)
- Tender weight: 37 LT 19 cwt (38,560 kg)
- Total weight: 104 LT 5 cwt (105,900 kg)
- Tender type: SH (2-axle bogies); SH, SK permitted
- Fuel type: Coal
- Fuel capacity: 6 LT (6.1 t)
- Water cap.: 3,225 imp gal (14,700 L)
- Firebox
  - Type: Belpaire
  - Grate area: 28 sq ft (2.6 m^{2})
- Boiler
  - Pitch: 7 ft 3 in (2,210 mm)
  - Diameter: 5 ft 3/4 in (1,543 mm)
  - Tube plates: 16 ft 4 3/4 in (4,997 mm)
  - Small tubes: 246: 2 in (51 mm)
- Boiler pressure: 180 psi (1,241 kPa)
- Safety valve: Ramsbottom
- Heating surface
  - Firebox: 119 sq ft (11.1 m^{2})
  - Tubes: 2,112 sq ft (196.2 m^{2})
  - Total surface: 2,231 sq ft (207.3 m^{2})
- Cylinders: Two
- Cylinder size: 19 in (483 mm) bore 24 in (610 mm) stroke
- Valve gear: Stephenson
- Valve type: Balanced slide
- Couplers: Johnston link-and-pin AAR knuckle (1930s)
Performance figures
- Tractive effort: 22,940 lbf (102.0 kN) @ 75%
Career
- Operators: Natal Government Railways; South African Railways
- Class: NGR Class A SAR Class 2
- Number in class: 2
- Numbers: NGR 325–326; SAR 762–763
- Nicknames: Hendrie A
- Delivered: 1905
- First run: 1905
- Withdrawn: 1936
- The 2nd coupled axle had flangeless wheels

The South African Railways Class 2 4-6-2 of 1905 was a steam locomotive from the pre-Union era in the Colony of Natal.

In 1905, the Natal Government Railways placed two Class A steam locomotives with a 4-6-2 Pacific type wheel arrangement in service. In 1912, when these locomotives were assimilated into the South African Railways, they were renumbered and designated Class 2.

== Manufacturer ==
In 1904, orders were placed with the North British Locomotive Company (NBL) for two 4-6-2 Pacific type locomotives for the Natal Government Railways (NGR). They were designed by NGR Locomotive Superintendent D.A. Hendrie for passenger traffic on those sections of the mainline between Ladysmith and Charlestown which did not have very severe gradients. When they were delivered and placed in service early in 1905, they were designated the NGR Class A, also commonly known as the Hendrie A, and numbered 325 and 326.

== Characteristics ==
The boiler of this Class was noted for its free steaming qualities. The engines used saturated steam, had Stephenson valve gear and were built on plate frames. The cylinders were inclined 1 in 18 and were arranged outside the plate frames, while the balanced slide valves were arranged inside the frames. After these two engines, Hendrie adopted Walschaerts valve gear and outside valves on all his subsequent locomotive designs for its greater accessibility.

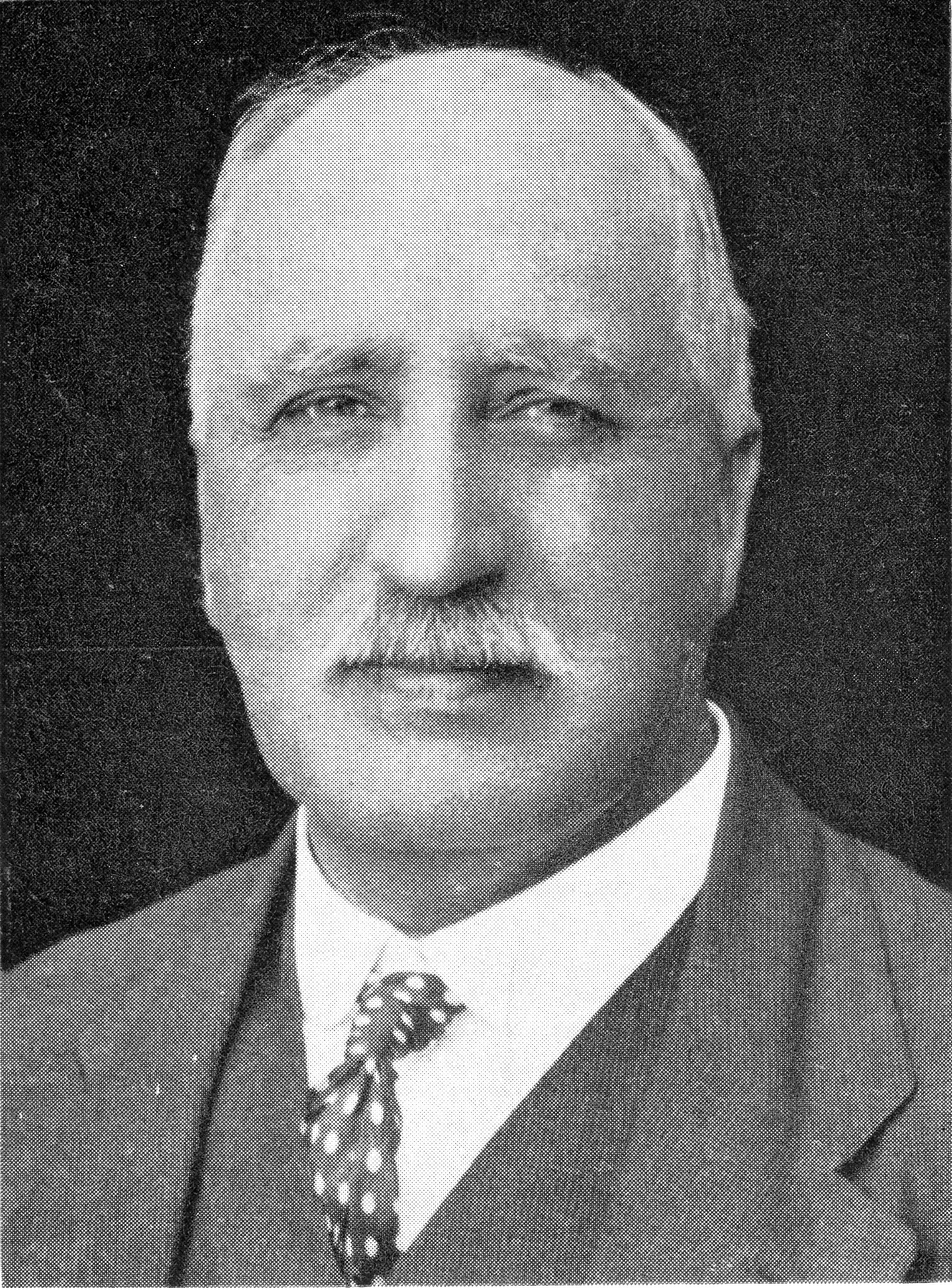
D.A. Hendrie

The locomotives had Belpaire fireboxes with firebar rocking finger grates. To accommodate the wide and deep firebox, Hendrie made use of a bridle casting along the same lines as the one which was first introduced by H.M. Beatty on his Cape Government Railways (CGR) 6th Class 2-6-2 of 1903, later the Class 6Y on the South African Railways (SAR).

With a bridle casting, the widening of the locomotive frame at the back end was accomplished by uniting the narrow front part of the frame and the wider rear part by the heavy steel casting. This method of widening the frames for the firebox continued on the SAR until the general adoption of bar frames for mainline locomotives by 1927 rendered it no longer necessary.

== Service ==
=== Natal Government Railways ===
The two locomotives ran their first trials on 31 January and 3 March 1905 respectively. As intended, they were placed in service between Ladysmith and Charlestown and were shedded at Charlestown. They worked the mail trains on this section for many years.

=== South African Railways ===
When the Union of South Africa was established on 31 May 1910, the three Colonial government railways (CGR, NGR and Central South African Railways) were united under a single administration to control and administer the railways, ports and harbours of the Union. Although the South African Railways and Harbours came into existence in 1910, the actual classification and renumbering of all the rolling stock of the three constituent railways were only implemented with effect from 1 January 1912.

In 1912, these two Pacifics were renumbered 762 and 763 and designated Class 2 on the SAR.

They were later transferred to the Witwatersrand for a short period, after which they worked on the Komatipoort-Waterval Boven section until they were withdrawn by 1936.
