= CGR Railmotor =

Class of 1 South African steam railcar

CGR Railmotor South African Railmotor
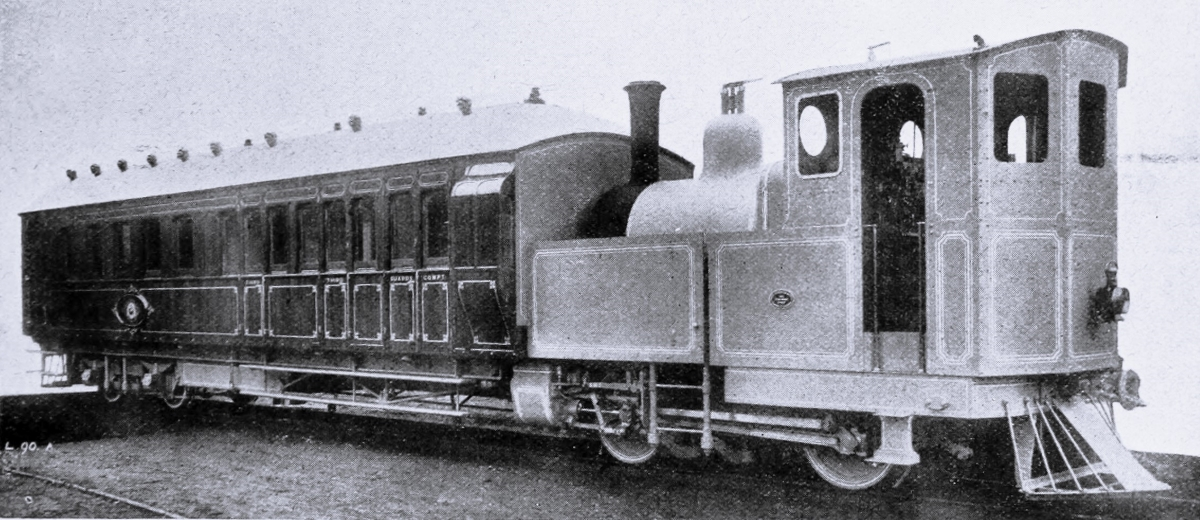
Type and origin
- Power type: Steam
- Designer: North British Locomotive Company
- Builder: Engine: North British Locomotive Company; Coach: Metropolitan Amalgamated Railway Carriage & Wagon
- Serial number: 16627
- Build date: 1905
- Total produced: 1
Specifications
- Configuration
  - Whyte: 0-4-0+4 (Four-coupled)
  - AAR: B-2
  - UIC: B'2'n2t
- Driver: 2nd coupled axle
- Gauge: 3 ft 6 in (1,067 mm) Cape gauge
- Fuel type: Coal
- Firebox
  - Type: Round-top
- Safety valve: Salter
- Cylinders: Two outside
- Couplers: Johnston link-and-pin
Career
- Operators: Cape Government Railways; South African Railways
- Class: Railmotor
- Number in class: 1
- Delivered: 1906
- First run: 1906
- Withdrawn: 1918

The Cape Government Railways Railmotor of 1906 was a one-off South African steam railmotor locomotive from the pre-Union era in the Cape of Good Hope.

In 1906, the Cape Government Railways acquired a single self-contained Railmotor for low-volume passenger service. The railmotor was a 0-4-0 side-tank locomotive with a passenger coach on a single bogie as an integral part of the locomotive itself.

== Manufacturer ==
A single railmotor was built in 1905 and delivered to the Cape Government Railways (CGR) in 1906. The railmotor was a self-contained motor-coach in which the locomotive and coach were embodied in a single vehicle, with a driver's station at the rear end of the coach for reverse running. The locomotive part was a 0-4-0 side-tank engine which was built by North British Locomotive Company, while the coach part was built by Metropolitan Amalgamated Railway Carriage & Wagon. It was the first steam railmotor to enter service on the CGR.

== Layout ==
The coach provides accommodation for 20 first class and 16 third class passengers. It was the only known steam railcar with a cab forward locomotive. To negotiate curves and points, the power unit of the locomotive pivoted like a bogie.

== Service ==
=== Cape Government Railways ===
The railmotor was intended for low-volume passenger service and was initially placed in service on the Franschhoek branch line. In its later years the railmotor worked a shuttle service between Bellville and Salt River.

=== South African Railways ===
When the Union of South Africa was established on 31 May 1910, the three Colonial government railways (CGR, Natal Government Railways and Central South African Railways) were united under a single administration to control and administer the railways, ports and harbours of the Union. Although the South African Railways and Harbours came into existence in 1910, the actual classification and renumbering of all the rolling stock of the three constituent railways were only implemented with effect from 1 January 1912.

In 1912, the railmotor was taken onto the SAR roster as an unclassified locomotive and was excluded from the renumbering schedules.

== Withdrawal ==
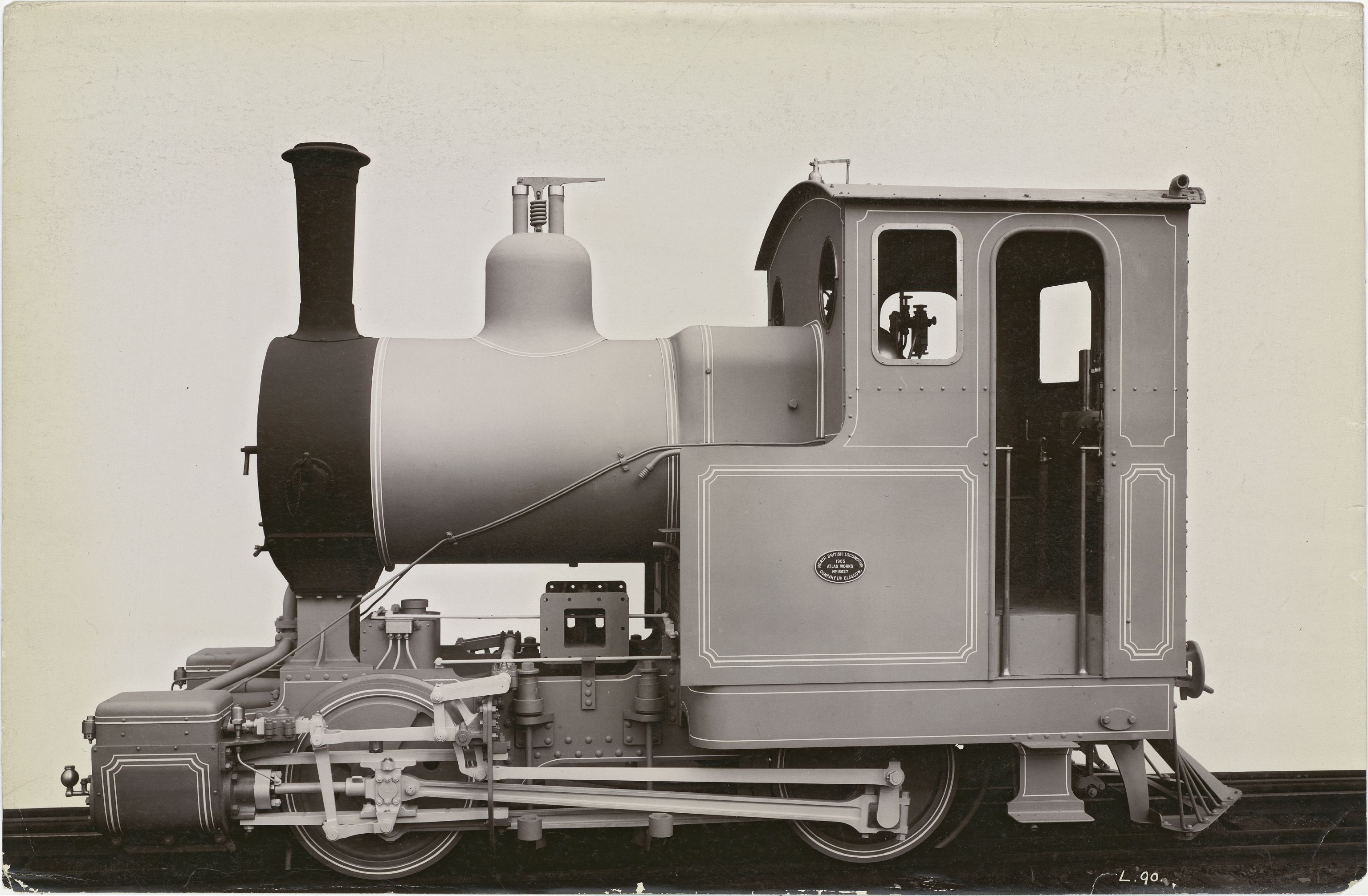
Works photo of the power unit.

The railmotor's advantage of easy reversing without the need to run a locomotive around at terminals, which would require a passing loop, was offset by the major disadvantage that any down-time for locomotive maintenance placed the entire vehicle out of service. This was possibly the reason why the railmotor did not have a long service life and was withdrawn from service in 1918.
