= South African type SK tender =

Steam locomotive tender in South Africa

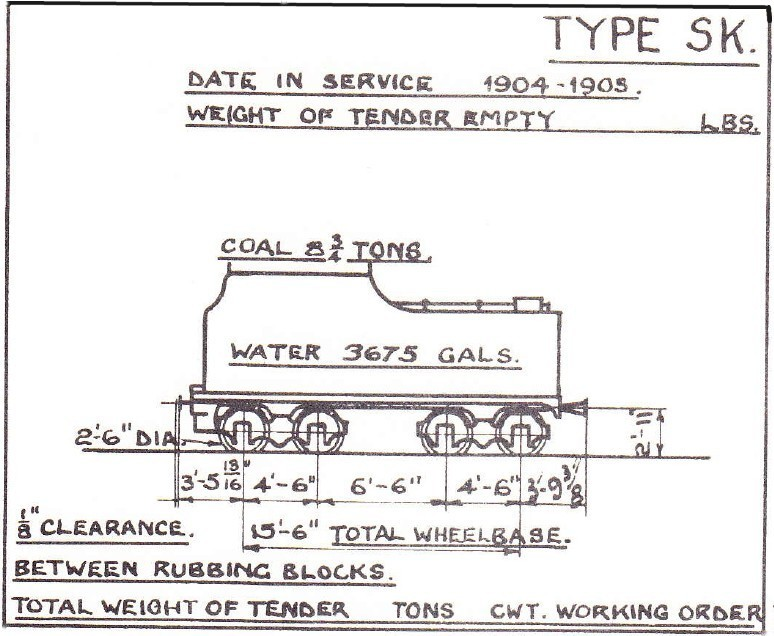
- SAR dimensional drawing
Type and origin
- Locomotive: SAR Classes 1, 1B & 2
- Designer: South African Railways
- Builder: South African Railways
- In service: c. 1925
- Rebuilt from: Type SH
- Rebuilder: South African Railways
Specifications
- Configuration: 2-axle bogies
- Gauge: 3 ft 6 in (1,067 mm) Cape gauge
- Length: 22 ft 9 3/16 in (6,939 mm)
- Wheel dia.: 30 in (762 mm)
- Wheelbase: 15 ft 6 in (4,724 mm)
  - Bogie: 4 ft 6 in (1,372 mm)
- Fuel type: Coal
- Fuel cap.: 8 LT 15 cwt (8.9 t)
- Water cap.: 3,675 imp gal (16,700 L)
- Stoking: Manual
- Couplers: Drawbar & Johnston link-and-pin Drawbar & AAR knuckle (1930s)
Career
- Operators: South African Railways
- Numbers: SAR 762-763, 1245-1288, 1440-1445

The South African type SK tender was a steam locomotive tender.

Type SK tenders were rebuilt from Type SH tenders which had entered service in 1904 and 1905. The rebuilding resulted in a tender with a larger water tank and larger coal bunker.

== Origin ==
The original Natal Government Railways (NGR) Class B Mastodon and Class A Pacific locomotives and tenders were designed in 1904 by NGR Locomotive Superintendent D.A. Hendrie.

Type SH tenders entered service as tenders to these locomotives in 1904 and 1905, built by the North British Locomotive Company.

== Rebuilding ==
From c. 1925, several of the Type SH tenders were completely rebuilt by the South African Railways (SAR) by mounting a new upper structure on the existing underframe, with larger water tanks and a larger coal capacity. These rebuilt tenders had a more modern appearance, with flush sides all the way to the top of the coal bunker. They were designated Type SK.

The program to rebuild several older tender types with new upper structures was begun by Col F.R. Collins DSO, who approved several of the detailed drawings for the work during his term in office as Chief Mechanical Engineer (CME) of the SAR from 1922 to 1929. It was continued by his successor, A.G. Watson.

== Characteristics ==
The rebuilt tender had a water capacity which had been increased from 3,225 to 3,675 imperial gallons (14,661 to 16,707 litres) and a coal capacity which had been increased from 6 long tons (6.1 tonnes) to 8 long tons 15 hundredweight (8.9 tonnes).

== Classification letters ==
Since many tender types are interchangeable between different locomotive classes and types, a tender classification system was adopted by the SAR. The first letter of the tender type indicates the classes of engines to which it could be coupled. The "S_" tenders could be used with the locomotive classes as shown.

- NGR Class B of 1904, SAR Class 1.
- NGR Class B of 1906, SAR Class 1B.
- NGR Class A of 1905, SAR Class 2.

The second letter indicates the tender's water capacity. The "_K" tenders had a capacity of 3,675 imperial gallons (16,700 litres; 4,410 US gallons).
