= South African Class 1 4-8-0 =

1904 design of steam locomotive

NGR Class B 4-8-0 1904 South African Class 1 4-8-0
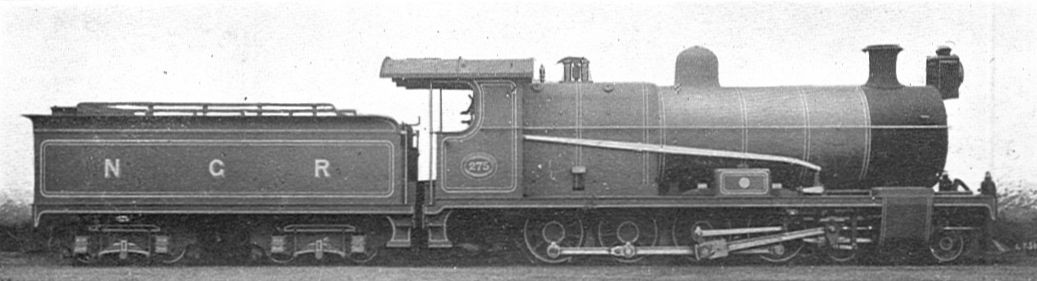
- SAR Class 1 no. 1245, ex NGR Class B no. 275
Type and origin
- Power type: Steam
- Designer: Natal Government Railways (D.A. Hendrie)
- Builder: North British Locomotive Company
- Serial number: 16370-16419
- Model: NGR Class B
- Build date: 1904
- Total produced: 50
- Rebuilder: Natal Government Railways
- Rebuild date: 1906
- Number rebuilt: 6 to Class B 4-8-2 (Mountain)
Specifications
- Configuration
  - Whyte: 4-8-0 (Mastodon)
  - UIC: 2'Dn2
- Driver: 2nd coupled axle
- Gauge: 3 ft 6 in (1,067 mm) Cape gauge
- Leading dia.: 28 1/2 in (724 mm)
- Coupled dia.: 45 1/2 in (1,156 mm)
- Tender wheels: 30 in (762 mm)
- Wheelbase: 49 ft 5/8 in (14,951 mm)
  - Engine: 22 ft 6 in (6,858 mm)
  - Leading: 6 ft (1,829 mm)
  - Coupled: 12 ft 9 in (3,886 mm)
  - Tender: 15 ft 6 in (4,724 mm)
  - Tender bogie: 4 ft 6 in (1,372 mm)
- Length
  - Over couplers: 56 ft 4 7/8 in (17,193 mm)
- Height: 12 ft 6 1/4 in (3,816 mm)
- Frame type: Plate
- Axle load: 14 LT 14 cwt (14,940 kg)
  - Leading: 14 LT 2 cwt (14,330 kg)
  - 1st coupled: 13 LT 9 cwt (13,670 kg)
  - 2nd coupled: 14 LT 14 cwt (14,940 kg)
  - 3rd coupled: 13 LT 18 cwt (14,120 kg)
  - 4th coupled: 13 LT 18 cwt (14,120 kg)
  - Tender bogie: Bogie 1: 18 LT 18 cwt (19,200 kg); Bogie 2: 19 LT 1 cwt (19,360 kg)
  - Tender axle: 9 LT 10 cwt 2 qtr (9,678 kg)
- Adhesive weight: 55 LT 19 cwt (56,850 kg)
- Loco weight: 70 LT 11 cwt (71,680 kg)
- Tender weight: 37 LT 19 cwt (38,560 kg)
- Total weight: 108 LT 10 cwt (110,200 kg)
- Tender type: SH (2-axle bogies); SH, SK permitted
- Fuel type: Coal
- Fuel capacity: 6 LT (6.1 t)
- Water cap.: 3,225 imp gal (14,700 L)
- Firebox
  - Type: Belpaire with combustion chamber
  - Grate area: 34 sq ft (3.2 m^{2})
- Boiler
  - Pitch: 7 ft 3 1/4 in (2,216 mm)
  - Diameter: 5 ft 4 3/4 in (1,645 mm)
  - Tube plates: 12 ft 1 in (3,683 mm)
  - Small tubes: 325: 2 in (51 mm)
- Boiler pressure: 190 psi (1,310 kPa)
- Safety valve: Ramsbottom
- Heating surface
  - Firebox: 132 sq ft (12.3 m^{2})
  - Tubes: 2,056 sq ft (191.0 m^{2})
  - Total surface: 2,188 sq ft (203.3 m^{2})
- Cylinders: Two
- Cylinder size: 20 1/2 in (521 mm) bore 24 in (610 mm) stroke
- Valve gear: Walschaerts
- Valve type: Balanced slide
- Couplers: Johnston link-and-pin AAR knuckle (1930s)
Performance figures
- Tractive effort: 31,240 lbf (139.0 kN) @ 75%
Career
- Operators: Natal Government Railways; South African Railways
- Class: NGR Class B SAR Class 1
- Number in class: 44
- Numbers: NGR 275-318; SAR 1245-1288
- Nicknames: Hendrie B
- Delivered: 1904
- First run: 1904
- Withdrawn: 1975
- The leading coupled axle had flangeless wheels

The South African Railways Class 1 4-8-0 of 1904 was a steam locomotive from the pre-Union era in the Colony of Natal.

In 1904, the Natal Government Railways placed fifty Class B 4-8-0 Mastodon type steam locomotives in service. Six of them were modified to a 4-8-2 Mountain type wheel arrangement in 1906. In 1912, when the remaining 44 4-8-0 locomotives were assimilated into the South African Railways, they were renumbered and designated Class 1.

== Design ==
Because of the limited coal and water range of the existing fleet of Natal Government Railways (NGR) tank locomotives as well as the necessity to double- and even triple-head over the worst sections of the mainline, NGR Locomotive Superintendent D.A. Hendrie was tasked to produce a locomotive of greater power and capable of longer distances without refuelling or rewatering to work the mainline's steep 1 in 30 (3 1/3%) gradients.

His resulting Class B achieved this, being more powerful and with a longer range. When the designs were completed, Hendrie proposed that only five locomotives should be ordered so that they may first be thoroughly tested in service before ordering more. The designs, however, were so well received that the NGR placed an immediate order for fifty locomotives with the North British Locomotive Company (NBL).

== Manufacturer ==
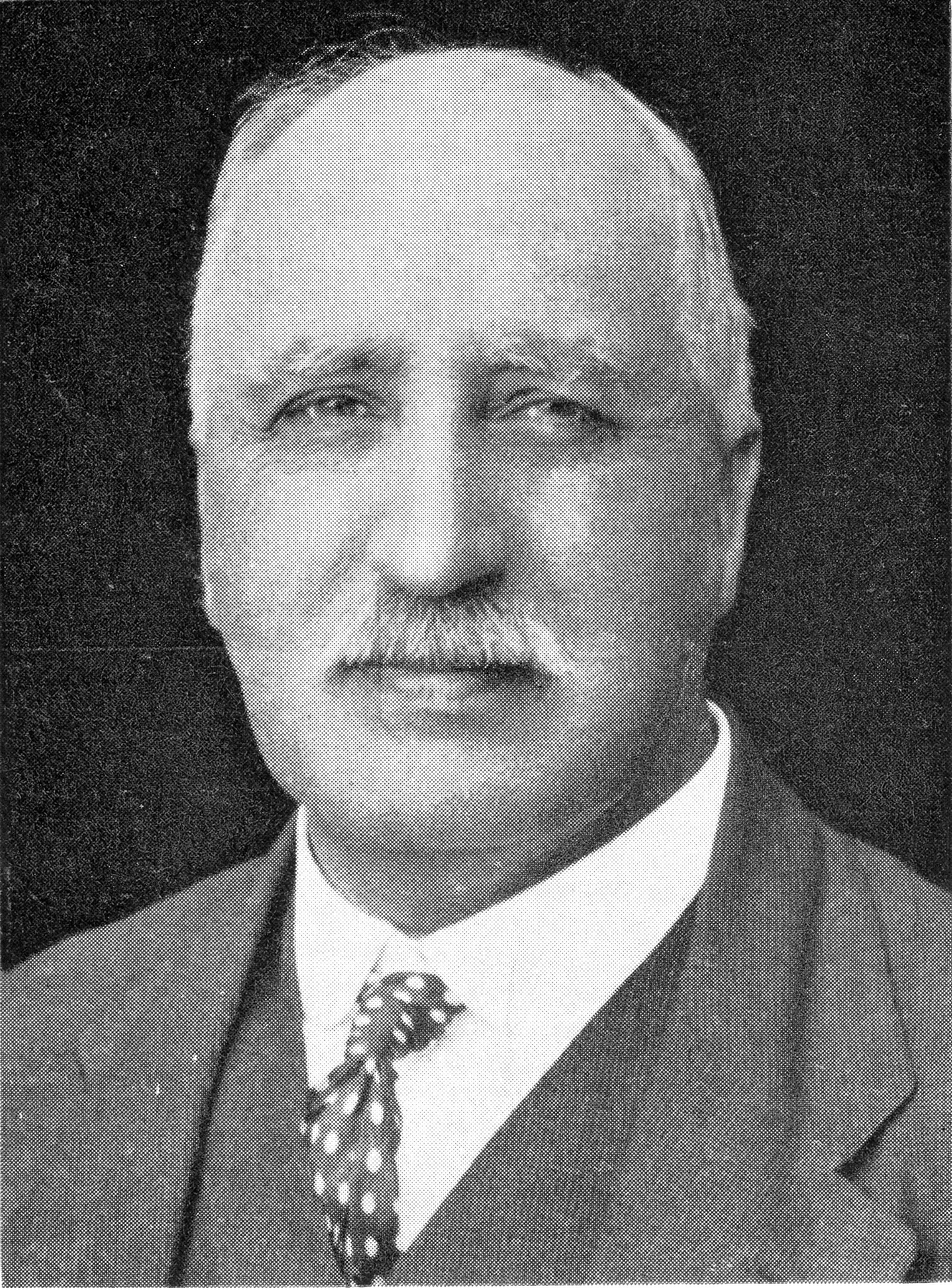
D.A. Hendrie

It does appear as though there was a fair degree of urgency to obtain these locomotives, evidenced on the one hand by the rush to place a large order for an untested locomotive and on the other hand by the fact that construction was accelerated by dividing it equally between NBL's Hyde Park and Queens Park works. The NGR's faith in Hendrie's ability turned out to be well justified, however, considering the fact that some of these locomotives remained in service for over seventy years.

Delivered in 1904, the Class B 4-8-0 Mastodon type was the first tender locomotive to be placed in service by the NGR apart from the single home-built 4-6-2TT engine Havelock of 1888. Fifty were built, those numbered in the range from 275 to 299 at the NBL Hyde Park works and those numbered in the range from 300 to 324 at the NBL Queens Park works.

The type SH tender was introduced along with these locomotives. It rode on two-axle bogies and had a capacity of 6 long tons (6.1 tonnes) coal and 3,225 imperial gallons (14,700 litres) water.

== Characteristics ==
=== Combustion chamber ===
Even though the boiler was not pitched very high, Hendrie had still managed to extend the Belpaire firebox sideways over the trailing coupled wheels, with the result that the grate was almost on a level with the bottom of the boiler shell. To prevent the fire from entering the lower row of tubes, Hendrie arranged a vertical firewall towards the front of the grate, which also created a dry combustion chamber.

This combustion chamber pre-dated the Gaines type, which was practically identical, by four years. The Gaines type was introduced in the United States of America in 1908 and became widely used on American locomotives. The firebox, of which the external dimensions were 9 feet 6 inches (2,896 millimetres) long and 6 feet (1,829 millimetres) wide, was arranged with finger bars and drop grates with a hopper-type ashpan.

=== Valve gear ===
The cylinders were arranged outside the 1 3/8 inches (35 millimetres) thick plate frames, with the flat D type balanced slide valves arranged above the cylinders and actuated by Walschaerts valve gear, the first time that this type of motion was used in Natal.

=== Electric headlight ===
Shortly after engine no. 275 had run its trials on 25 October 1904, it was fitted with a Pyle National Electric headlight which consisted of a self-contained turbine and dynamo and an arc lamp, placed on top of the smokebox in front of the chimney and supported by two brackets. The headlight proved so successful that it gradually replaced the old huge oil-burning lamps, which had been in use for over fifty years, on all mainline locomotives.

== Performance ==
Compared to the Reid Tenwheeler, the Class B was able to haul 7.5% more load and, on average, ran 26,000 miles (41,843 kilometres) more before requiring repairs.

== Modifications ==
Six of the locomotives, those numbered in the range from 319 to 324, were modified to 4-8-2 Mountain types in 1906, but retained their Class B designation on the NGR.

Another locomotive, no. 280, was equipped with steam reversing gear in 1907, also to Hendrie's design. The steam reverser proved to be an unqualified success and was soon adopted as standard equipment on the rest of the Class. It was fitted to all engines which were subsequently designed by Hendrie and remained the standard reverser on South African steam locomotives well into the 1940s.

== South African Railways ==
When the Union of South Africa was established on 31 May 1910, the three Colonial government railways (Cape Government Railways, NGR and Central South African Railways) were united under a single administration to control and administer the railways, ports and harbours of the Union. Although the South African Railways and Harbours came into existence in 1910, the actual classification and renumbering of all the rolling stock of the three constituent railways were only implemented with effect from 1 January 1912.

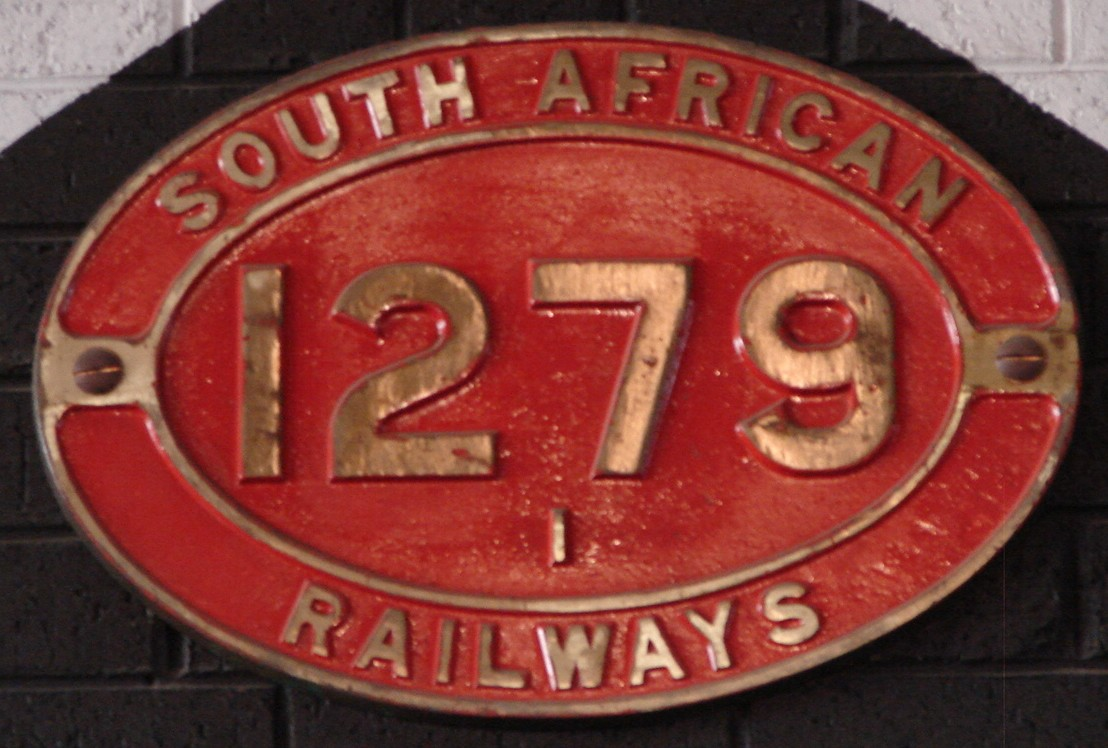

In 1912, the remaining 44 Mastodon types were renumbered in the range from 1245 to 1288 and designated Class 1 on the South African Railways (SAR). Upon their renumbering onto the SAR roster, the six modified 4-8-2 Mountain types were classified separately from the rest as Class 1B.

== Service ==
The locomotives were placed in service hauling all the fast passenger and goods trains between Durban and Pietermaritzburg and were the first locomotives to accomplish a return working of this service within a day, with the same crewmen. These locomotives opened up a new era on the NGR, where the tank locomotive was at last withdrawn from mainline working. Later, in SAR service, these locomotives were also used on mainline workings out of Port Elizabeth.

In their later years they were relegated to shunting, particularly working in Natal but also in Cape Town, Port Elizabeth, East London and in Transvaal. Although their gradual withdrawal from service already commenced in 1935, half of the Class were still in capital stock by March 1972, with the last one only being written off in 1975.

In industrial service, two of the locomotives survived even longer and were still in service in 1984.

- SAR no. 1252 as Randfontein Estates Gold Mine no. 4.
- SAR no. 1277 as Apex Mines no. 2 at Greenside.

== Works numbers and renumbering ==
Their works numbers, numbering, SAR reclassification and renumbering are listed in the table.

NGR Class B 4-8-0 of 1904 SAR Class 1 4-8-0
Works no.	NGR no.	SAR Class	SAR no.
16370	275	Class 1	1245
16371	276	Class 1	1246
16372	277	Class 1	1247
16373	278	Class 1	1248
16374	279	Class 1	1249
16375	280	Class 1	1250
16376	281	Class 1	1251
16377	282	Class 1	1252
16378	283	Class 1	1253
16379	284	Class 1	1254
16380	285	Class 1	1255
16381	286	Class 1	1256
16382	287	Class 1	1257
16383	288	Class 1	1258
16384	289	Class 1	1259
16385	290	Class 1	1260
16386	291	Class 1	1261
16387	292	Class 1	1262
16388	293	Class 1	1263
16389	294	Class 1	1264
16390	295	Class 1	1265
16391	296	Class 1	1266
16392	297	Class 1	1267
16393	298	Class 1	1268
16394	299	Class 1	1269
16395	300	Class 1	1270
16396	301	Class 1	1271
16397	302	Class 1	1272
16398	303	Class 1	1273
16399	304	Class 1	1274
16400	305	Class 1	1275
16401	306	Class 1	1276
16402	307	Class 1	1277
16403	308	Class 1	1278
16404	309	Class 1	1279
16405	310	Class 1	1280
16406	311	Class 1	1281
16407	312	Class 1	1282
16408	313	Class 1	1283
16409	314	Class 1	1284
16410	315	Class 1	1285
16411	316	Class 1	1286
16412	317	Class 1	1287
16413	318	Class 1	1288
16414	319	Class 1B	1440
16415	320	Class 1B	1441
16416	321	Class 1B	1442
16417	322	Class 1B	1443
16418	323	Class 1B	1444
16419	324	Class 1B	1445

== Preservation ==
Only two of these engines survive.

Number	Works nmr	THF / Private	Leaselend / Owner	Current Location	Outside South Africa	?
1247	NBL / 16372	THF	Museum	Bloemfontein Locomotive Depot		
1276	NBL / 16401	Private	RSSA – Trust	Hilton (Station)		

== Illustration ==
The main picture shows NGR Class B no. 275, later SAR Class 1 no. 1245, as delivered. The Belpaire firebox is markedly longer than usual as a result of the combustion chamber.

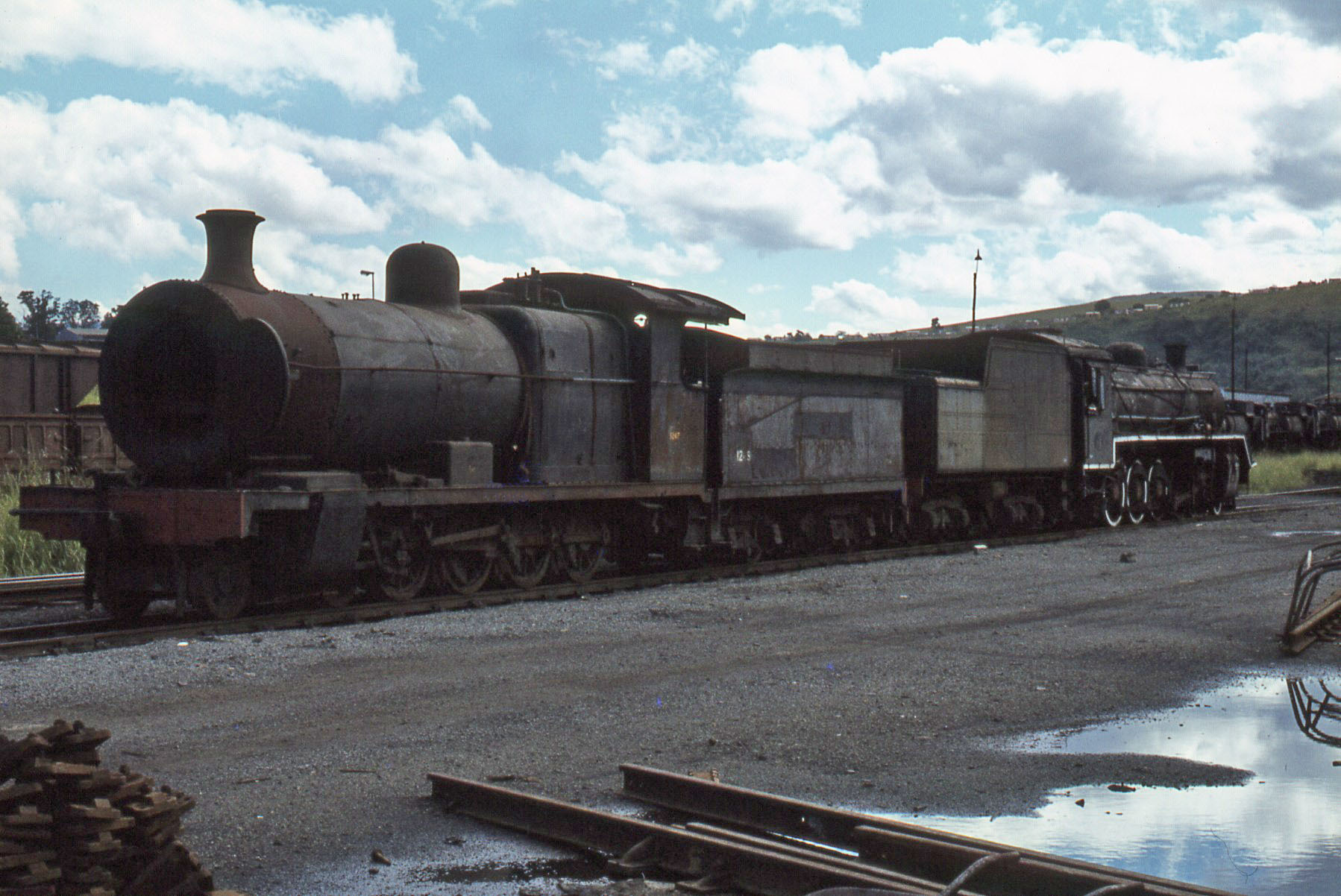
NGR no. 277, SAR no. 1247, at Mason's Mill, Pietermaritzburg, 29 March 1979

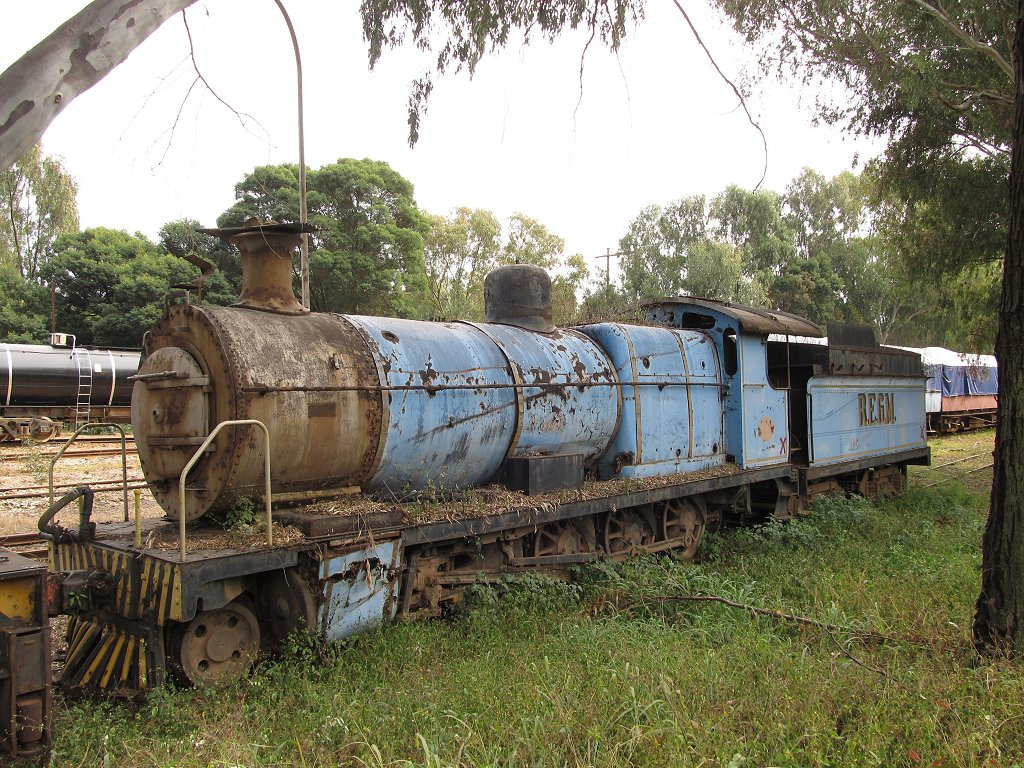
NGR no. 282, SAR no. 1252, REGM no. 4, at SANRASM, 6 June 2011

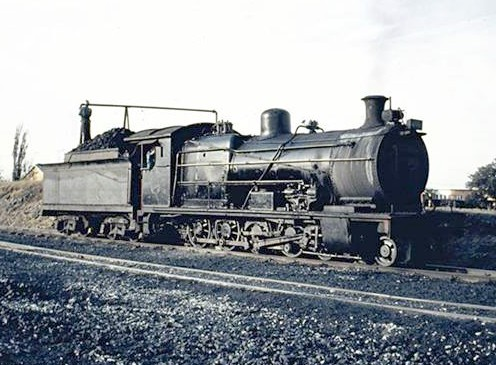
NGR no. 307, SAR no. 1277, at Delmas Colliery, Hawerklip, May 1977
