= NGR Class N 4-6-2T 1906 =

Type of steam locomotive

NGR Class N 4-6-2T 1906 South African NG 4-6-2T 1906
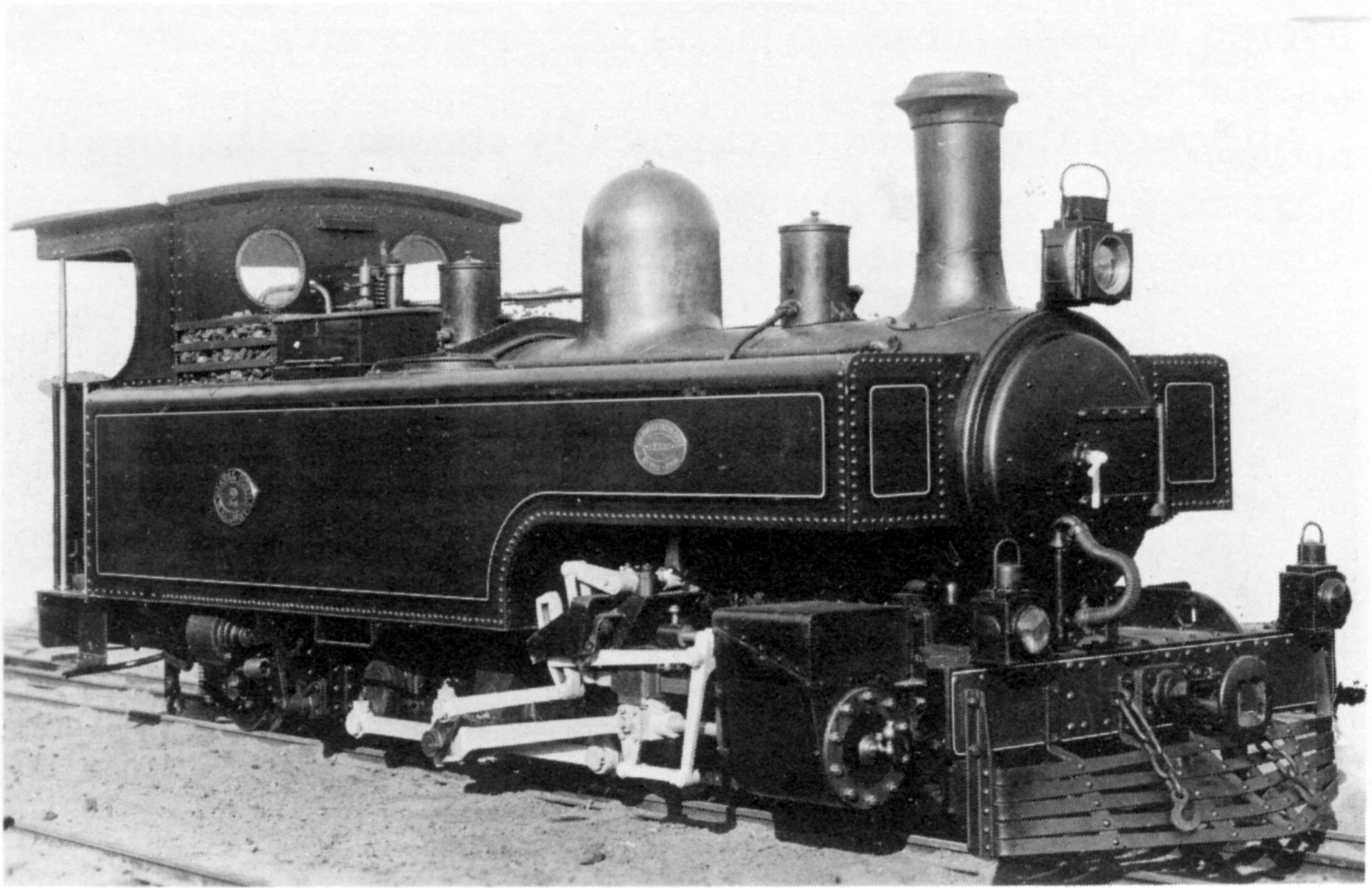
- NGR Class N 4-6-2T no. 2
Type and origin
- Power type: Steam
- Designer: Natal Government Railways (D.A. Hendrie)
- Builder: Hunslet Engine Company
- Serial number: 892–893
- Build date: 1906
- Total produced: 2
Specifications
- Configuration
  - Whyte: 4-6-2T (Pacific)
  - UIC: 2'C1'n2t
- Driver: 2nd coupled axle
- Gauge: 2 ft (610 mm) narrow
- Leading dia.: 18 in (457 mm)
- Coupled dia.: 30 in (762 mm)
- Trailing dia.: 20 in (508 mm)
- Wheelbase: 17 ft (5,182 mm)
  - Leading: 3 ft 6 in (1,067 mm)
  - Coupled: 5 ft 9 in (1,753 mm)
- Length
  - Over couplers: 24 ft 1/2 in (7,328 mm)
- Height: 9 ft 4 1/2 in (2,858 mm)
- Frame type: Plate
- Axle load: 5 LT 9 cwt 1 qtr (5,550 kg)
- Loco weight: 23 LT 19 cwt (24,330 kg)
- Fuel type: Coal
- Fuel capacity: 22 long hundredweight 2 qtr (1.1 t)
- Water cap.: 750 imp gal (3,410 L)
- Firebox
  - Type: Round-top
  - Grate area: 11 sq ft (1.0 m^{2})
- Boiler
  - Pitch: 4 ft 6 in (1,372 mm)
  - Diameter: 3 ft 4 1/2 in (1,029 mm) outside
  - Tube plates: 10 ft 2 in (3,099 mm)
  - Small tubes: 124: 1 3/4 in (44 mm)
- Boiler pressure: 165 psi (1,138 kPa)
- Safety valve: Ramsbottom
- Heating surface: 132 sq ft (12.3 m^{2})
- Cylinders: Two
- Cylinder size: 11 1/2 in (292 mm) bore 15 in (381 mm) stroke
- Valve gear: Walschaerts
- Valve type: Murdoch's D slide
- Couplers: Johnston link-and-pin
Performance figures
- Tractive effort: 8,183 lbf (36 kN) @ 75%
- Factor of adh.: 4.39:1
Career
- Operators: Natal Government Railways; South African Railways; Moçâmedes Railway
- Class: Class N
- Number in class: 2
- Numbers: NGR 1-2, SAR NG1-NG2
- Delivered: 1906
- First run: 1906
- Withdrawn: 1915

The Natal Government Railways Class N 4-6-2T of 1906 was a South African steam locomotive from the pre-Union era in the Natal Colony.

In April 1906, the Natal Government Railways placed its first two 4-6-2T narrow-gauge tank steam locomotives in service. In 1912, when these locomotives were assimilated into the South African Railways, they retained their engine numbers, but with an "NG" prefix added. They were sold to the Moçâmedes Railway in Portuguese West Africa in 1915.

== Natal's narrow gauge ==
By 1906, the Natal Government had realised that light railways were essential as feeders to open up fertile districts which were distant from the existing main- and branch lines, particularly when the intervening stretches of country were difficult from an engineering point of view. The construction of the first narrow-gauge railway line in Natal was therefore approved.

The line was 28 3/4 miles (46.3 kilometres) long and stretched from Estcourt to the irrigation settlement of Weenen, an alluvial flat of about 5,000 acres (2,000 hectares) adjoining the Bushman's River. The maximum gradient on this line was 1 in 33 (3⅓%) compensated, with a minimum curvature of 175 feet (53 metres) radius. It was laid with 35 pounds per yard (17 kilograms per metre) rail.

== Manufacturer ==
The Class N 4-6-2T tank locomotive was designed by D.A. Hendrie, Locomotive Superintendent of the Natal Government Railways (NGR) from 1902 to 1910. It was the first narrow-gauge locomotive of the NGR.

An order for the construction of two of these locomotives was placed with Hunslet Engine Company in 1906. They were delivered in April 1906, numbered 1 and 2, and were placed in construction service on the new narrow-gauge line to Weenen.

== Characteristics ==
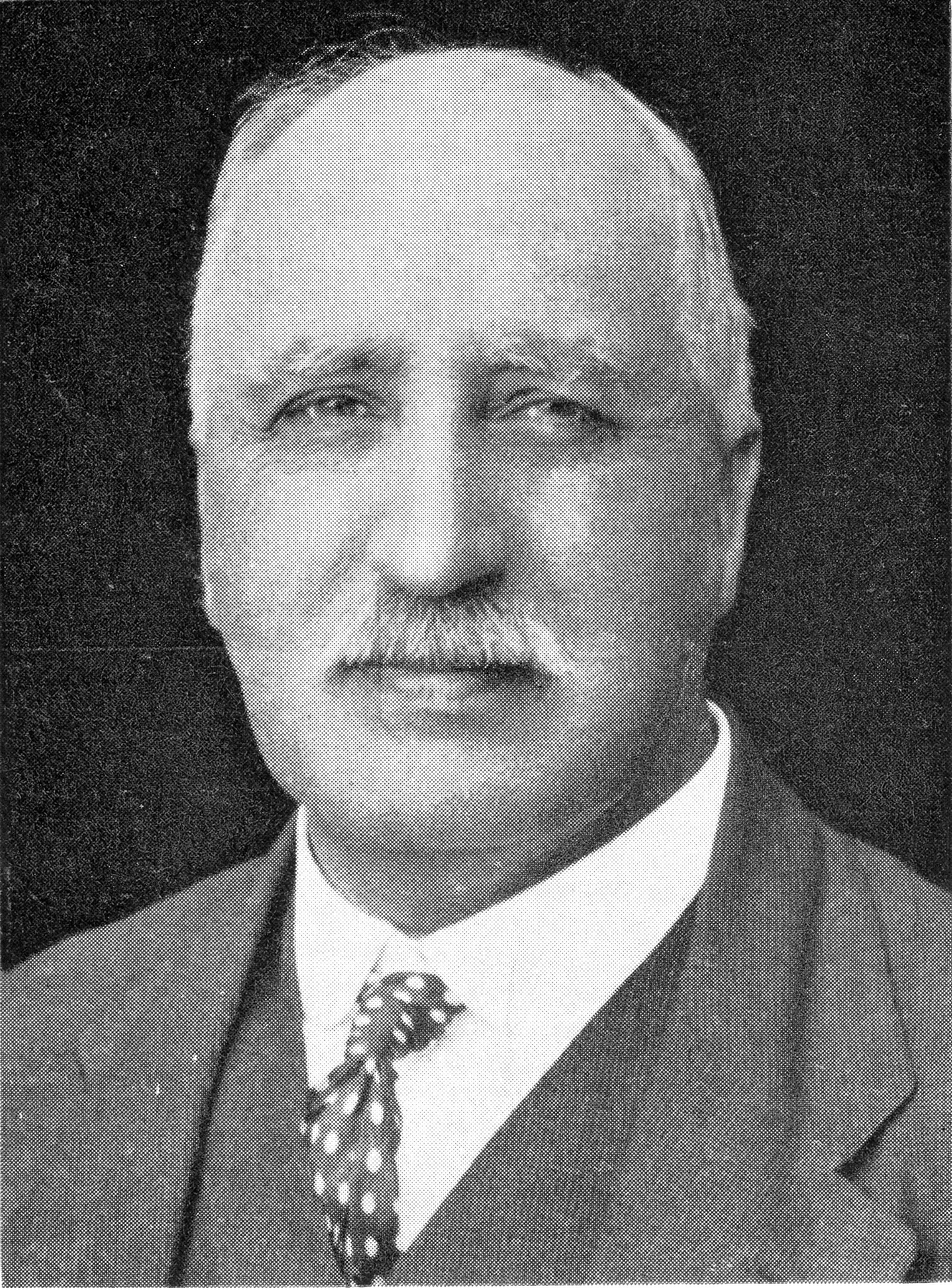
D.A. Hendrie

Commonly known as the Hunslet Side Tanks, the locomotives had outside plate frames and used Walschaerts valve gear. The firebox was 3 feet 4 1/2 inches (1,029 millimetres) long and, to obtain the required grate area, the width was extended to 4 ft 4 1/2 in (1,334 mm) at the foundation ring. To obtain a liberal firebox depth, the frames were opened out for some length at the rear end, with each frame constructed in two pieces which were connected by a cross stretcher in front of the firebox throat plate.

The cylinders were arranged horizontally outside the plate frames, while the flat "D" type slide valves were arranged above the cylinders and actuated by Walschaerts valve gear.

== Service ==
=== Natal Government Railways ===
The Weenen narrow-gauge line was opened to regular passenger and goods traffic on 18 April 1907. As a result of tick fever restrictions upon the movement of ox wagon transport, a limited goods traffic service was already inaugurated on 4 October 1906 while the line was still under construction. This limited service was by construction train from Estcourt to Halfway House, a distance of 18 miles (29 kilometres). By the end of 1906, the limited service had been extended all the way to Weenen.

The two engines performed well and were capable of hauling loads of 80 long tons (81.3 tonnes) up the maximum gradients with comparative ease at about 8 mph (13 km/h). On easier sections they were able to attain a maximum speed of 15 mph (24 km/h).

When a locomotive classification system was introduced on the NGR by 1908, all narrow-gauge locomotives were designated Class N.

=== South African Railways ===
When the Union of South Africa was established on 31 May 1910, the three Colonial government railways (Cape Government Railways, NGR and Central South African Railways) were united under a single administration to control and administer the railways, ports and harbours of the Union. Although the South African Railways and Harbours came into existence in 1910, the actual classification and renumbering of all the rolling stock of the three constituent railways were only implemented with effect from 1 January 1912.

The two locomotives were not renumbered by the South African Railways (SAR) in 1912, but had the letters NG, for narrow gauge, prefixed to their existing numbers. They remained unclassified on the SAR, since a classification system for narrow-gauge locomotives was only adopted in the late 1920s after they had been withdrawn from service.

=== Moçâmedes Railway ===
In 1915, both locomotives were sold to the Moçâmedes Railway in Portuguese West Africa.
