= South African Class 1B 4-8-2 =

1904 design of steam locomotive

NGR Class B 4-8-2 1906 South African Class 1B 4-8-2
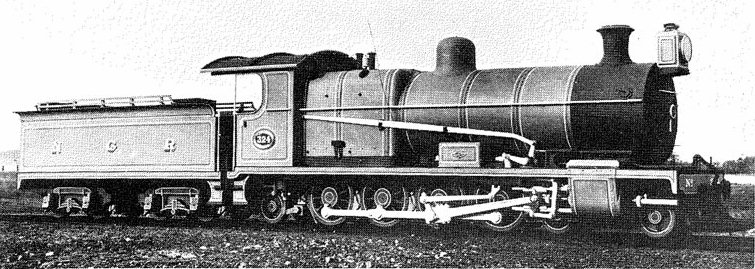
- SAR Class 1B no. 1445, ex NGR Class B no. 324
Type and origin
- Power type: Steam
- Designer: Natal Government Railways (D.A. Hendrie)
- Builder: North British Locomotive Company; Natal Government Railways
- Serial number: 16414-16419
- Model: NGR Class B
- Build date: 1906
- Total produced: 6
- Rebuilder: South African Railways
- Rebuild date: 1926-1928
- Number rebuilt: 6 to SAR Class 1 4-8-0 (Mastodon)
Specifications
- Configuration
  - Whyte: 4-8-2 (Mountain)
  - UIC: 2'D1'n2
- Driver: 2nd coupled axle
- Gauge: 3 ft 6 in (1,067 mm) Cape gauge
- Leading dia.: 28 1/2 in (724 mm)
- Coupled dia.: 45 1/2 in (1,156 mm)
- Trailing dia.: 28 1/2 in (724 mm)
- Tender wheels: 30 in (762 mm)
- Wheelbase: 49 ft 5/8 in (14,951 mm)
  - Engine: 27 ft 6 in (8,382 mm)
  - Leading: 6 ft (1,829 mm)
  - Coupled: 12 ft 9 in (3,886 mm)
  - Tender: 15 ft 6 in (4,724 mm)
  - Tender bogie: 4 ft 6 in (1,372 mm)
- Length
  - Over couplers: 56 ft 4 7/8 in (17,193 mm)
- Height: 12 ft 6 in (3,810 mm)
- Frame type: Plate
- Axle load: 14 LT 17 cwt (15,090 kg)
  - Leading: 12 LT 2 cwt (12,290 kg)
  - 1st coupled: 14 LT 2 cwt (14,330 kg)
  - 2nd coupled: 14 LT 17 cwt (15,090 kg)
  - 3rd coupled: 14 LT (14,220 kg)
  - 4th coupled: 13 LT (13,210 kg)
  - Trailing: 2 LT 10 cwt (2,540 kg)
  - Tender bogie: Bogie 1: 18 LT 18 cwt (19,200 kg); Bogie 2: 19 LT 1 cwt (19,360 kg)
  - Tender axle: 9 LT 10 cwt 2 qtr (9,678 kg)
- Adhesive weight: 55 LT 19 cwt (56,850 kg)
- Loco weight: 70 LT 11 cwt (71,680 kg)
- Tender weight: 37 LT 19 cwt (38,560 kg)
- Total weight: 108 LT 10 cwt (110,200 kg)
- Tender type: SH (2-axle bogies); SH, SK permitted
- Fuel type: Coal
- Fuel capacity: 6 LT (6.1 t)
- Water cap.: 3,225 imp gal (14,700 L)
- Firebox
  - Type: Belpaire & combustion chamber
  - Grate area: 34 sq ft (3.2 m^{2})
- Boiler
  - Pitch: 7 ft 3 in (2,210 mm)
  - Diameter: 5 ft 4 3/4 in (1,645 mm)
  - Tube plates: 12 ft 1 in (3,683 mm)
  - Small tubes: 325: 2 in (51 mm)
- Boiler pressure: 190 psi (1,310 kPa)
- Safety valve: Ramsbottom
- Heating surface
  - Firebox: 128.63 sq ft (11.950 m^{2})
  - Tubes: 2,094.17 sq ft (194.555 m^{2})
  - Total surface: 2,222.8 sq ft (206.50 m^{2})
- Cylinders: Two
- Cylinder size: 20 1/2 in (521 mm) bore 24 in (610 mm) stroke
- Valve gear: Walschaerts
- Valve type: Murdoch's D slide
- Couplers: Johnston link-and-pin AAR knuckle (1930s)
Performance figures
- Tractive effort: 31,600 lbf (141 kN) @ 75%
Career
- Operators: Natal Government Railways; South African Railways
- Class: NGR Altered Class B SAR Class 1B
- Number in class: 6
- Numbers: NGR 319-324; SAR 1440-1445
- Delivered: 1906
- First run: 1906
- Withdrawn: 1935-1975
- The leading coupled axle had flangeless wheels

The South African Railways Class 1B 4-8-2 of 1904 was a steam locomotive from the pre-Union era in the Colony of Natal.

In 1904, the Natal Government Railways placed fifty Class B locomotives with a 4-8-0 Mastodon wheel arrangement in service. Of these, six were modified in 1906 to Altered Class B locomotives, the first tender engines in the world with a 4-8-2 Mountain wheel arrangement. In 1912, when these six engines were assimilated into the South African Railways, they were renumbered and designated Class 1B.

== Manufacturer ==
At the time when D.A. Hendrie was appointed as the Locomotive Superintendent of the Natal Government Railways (NGR), it had a large fleet of tank locomotives with an inherent limited coal and water range. It was also often necessary to double- and even triple-head trains over the worst sections of the mainline with its steep 1 in 30 (3⅓%) gradients. Hendrie was therefore tasked to produce a locomotive of greater power and capable of longer distances without refuelling or rewatering. His resulting Hendrie B achieved this and fifty such locomotives were delivered from the North British Locomotive Company (NBL) in 1904.

== Characteristics ==
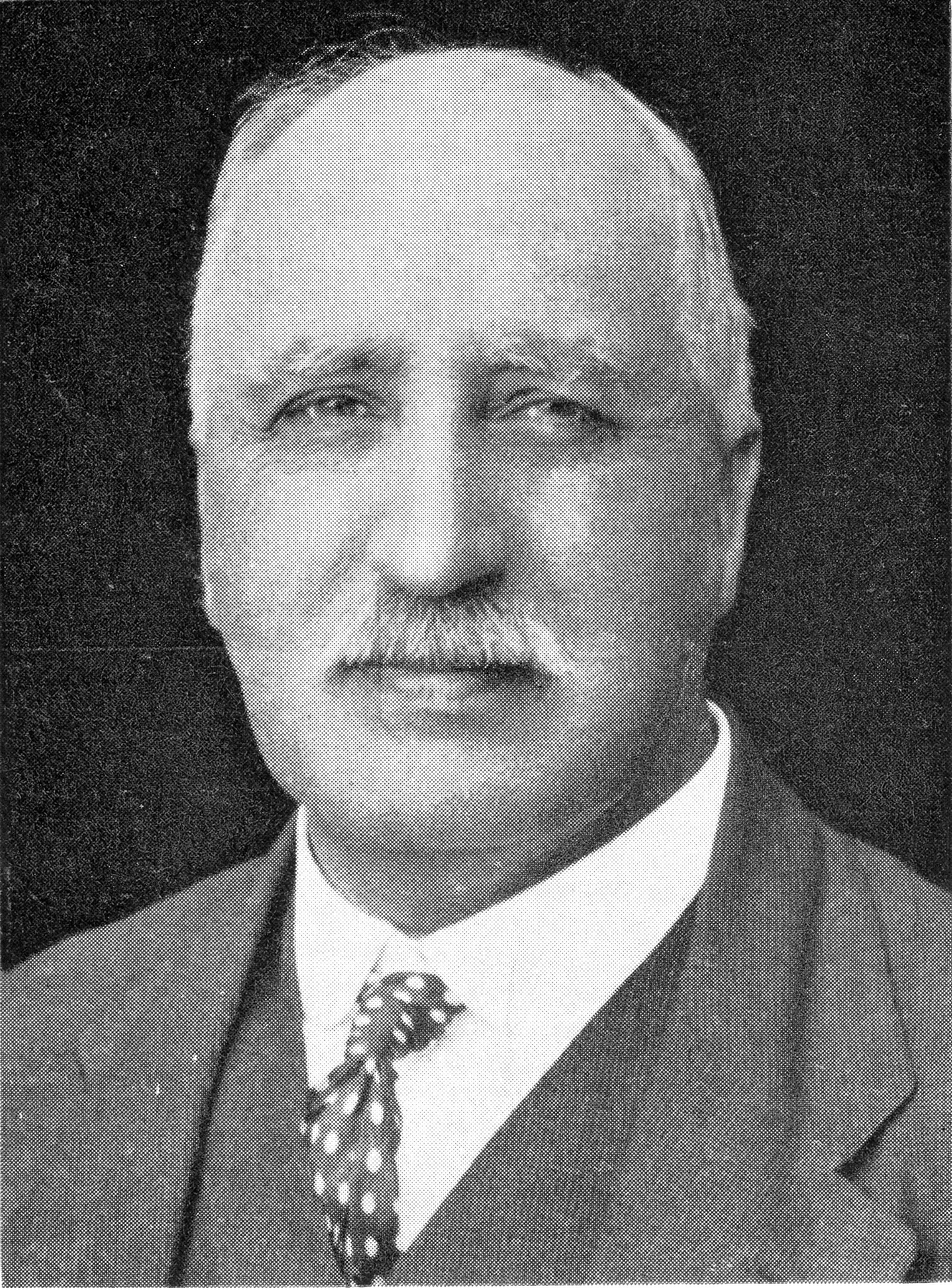
D.A. Hendrie

The engines used saturated steam and had plate frames, Belpaire fireboxes, Walschaerts valve gear and "D" slide valves. While the boiler was not pitched very high, Hendrie had still managed to extend the firebox sideways over the trailing driving wheels, with the result that the grate was almost on a level with the bottom of the boiler shell. To prevent the fire from entering the lower row of tubes, Hendrie arranged a vertical firewall towards the front of the grate, which created a dry combustion chamber.

== Modifications ==
=== The first Mountain ===
In 1906, six of these locomotives with numbers in the range from 319 to 324, were modified to a 4-8-2 wheel arrangement by adding a trailing bissel truck below the cab. The modification was deemed necessary to ensure extra smooth running while hauling fast passenger trains. This modification turned them into the NGR's Altered Class B, the first 4-8-2 Mountain type tender locomotives in the world.

=== Steam reverser ===
Beginning in 1907, these locomotives were equipped with steam reversing gear, also designed by Hendrie. All Hendrie's locomotives also came equipped with piston tail rods, but since they were difficult and costly to maintain, they were removed in 1925.

== South African Railways ==
When the Union of South Africa was established on 31 May 1910, the three Colonial government railways (Cape Government Railways, NGR and Central South African Railways) were united under a single administration to control and administer the railways, ports and harbours of the Union. Although the South African Railways and Harbours came into existence in 1910, the actual classification and renumbering of all the rolling stock of the three constituent railways were only implemented with effect from 1 January 1912.

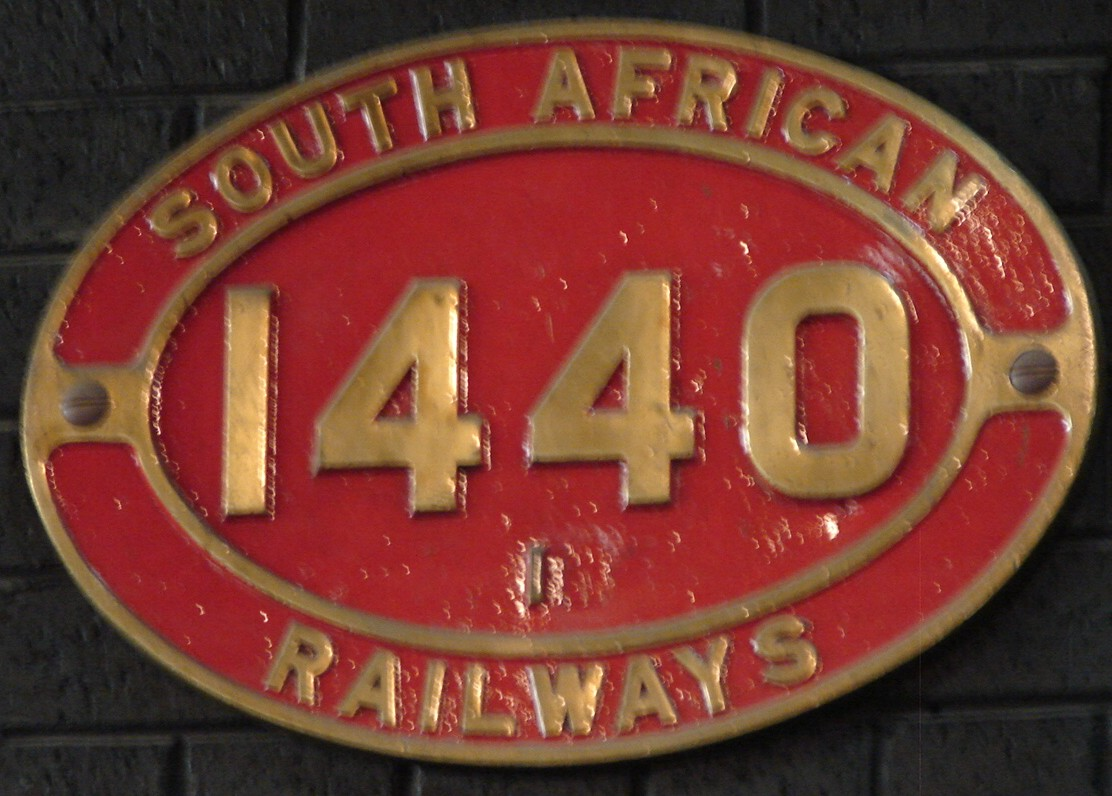

In 1912, these six Mountain types were renumbered in the range from 1440 to 1445 and designated Class 1B on the South African Railways (SAR).

Between 1926 and 1928, new locomotives replaced the SAR Class 1B on mainline passenger service in Natal. Their trailing bissel trucks were then removed and, since they were once again identical to their sister Class 1 4-8-0 Mastodon types, they were all reclassified to Class 1. Instead of replacing the cabside number plates upon reclassification, the "B" of "1B" was ground or milled off.

== Service ==
In their later years, the locomotives were relegated to shunting, particularly working in Natal but also in Cape Town, Port Elizabeth, East London and in Transvaal. The last of the class was withdrawn in 1975. In industrial service, no. 1443 was still in service in 1984 as Gledhow Sugar Mill's no. 1, Chaka. The engine still survives and is owned by the North British Locomotive Preservation Group.

== Works numbers and renumbering ==
The works numbers and renumbering of the Class 1B are listed in the table.

NGR Class B 4-8-2 of 1906 SAR Class 1B 4-8-2
Works no.	NGR no.	SAR no.
16414	319	1440
16415	320	1441
16416	321	1442
16417	322	1443
16418	323	1444
16419	324	1445

== Preservation ==
One Class 1B has survived into preservation.

Number	Works nmr	THF / Private	Leaselend / Owner	Current Location	Outside SOUTH AFRICA	?
1440		Private	North British Preservation	Hilton Station		
