= Natal Government Railways =

Railway of the Colony of Natal

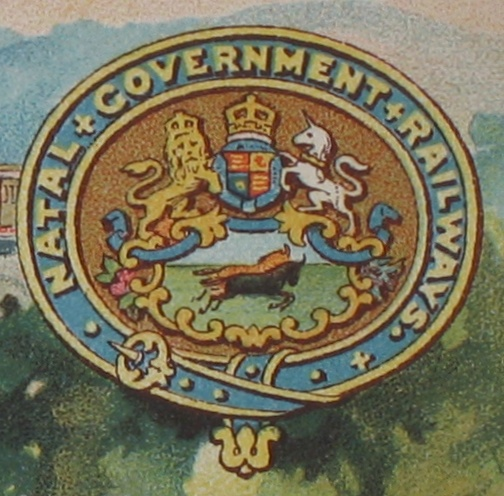
- Type: Government-owned corporation
- Predecessor: Natal Railway
- Founded: 1877
- Defunct: 1910
- Successor: South African Railways

Railway network of Natal in 1910, immediately before the formation of the Union of South Africa

The Natal Government Railways (NGR) was formed in January 1877 in the Colony of Natal.

In 1877, the Natal Government Railways acquired the Natal Railway Company for the sum of £40,000, gaining the line from the Point to Durban and from Durban to Umgeni. This move, inspired in part by the neighbouring Cape Prime Minister John Molteno's 1873 establishment of the Cape Government Railways, was intended to drive the extension of Natal's railways inland, towards the Drakensberg and eventually the Orange Free State. The Natal Government Railways also adopted the Cape gauge. The core line went from Durban to Volksrust, but reached Charlestown (4 kilometres (2.5 mi) from the border of the South African Republic) in 1891 and was linked to the Witwatersrand in 1895. Other important lines were the one linking with the Orange Free State reaching Harrismith in 1892, as well as the North Coast and South Coast lines. In 1910, the Union of South Africa was formed and in 1912 the NGR combined with the other colonies' railway companies (Cape Government Railways and Central South African Railways) to form the South African Railways and Harbours (SAR & H).

== Lines and business history ==
The core line connected Durban to the Witwatersrand and was completed in 1895. There were also lines on the northern and southern coasts. The Orange Free State (OVS) line went over the Drakensberg, connecting Ladysmith to Kroonstad by its completion in 1906. Although more than 80% of the railway was in the OVS, it was built under the auspices of the NGR.

Until Natal gained autonomy in 1893, the 10 km (6.2 mi) long railway from Glencoe to the coal mines of Dundee was the only branch line of the NGR, but when NGR was merged into the broader South African railway network on 1 January 1912, the branch lines occupied 40% of the NGR rail network.

Here is the railway over the years and by the numbers:

Year	Average	Distance	Financial	Record (£'000)
	mi	km	Income	Expenses
1860	2	3	77.5	73.0
1870	6	10	126.3	117.0
1880	95.5	154	582.7	477.1
1889-1890	225	362	1507.8	1393.9
1899-1900	567	912	886.7	1990.5
1909-10	987	1588	4293.7	3530.3

== Construction ==
The line from Durban to Pietermaritzburg was already proposed in 1862, but it was not surveyed until 1873. Under Natal Law 4 of 1875, Natal Government Railways (NGR) was authorized to build three lines from the Point Waterfront: one of 78 miles (126 km) from Durban to Pietermaritzburg, one along the Natal South Coast to near Isipingo, and one along the North Coast to near Verulam. The Natal colonial government paid for the lines with a £1.2 million loan obtained in London.

=== Durban to Pietermaritzburg ===
The line to Pietermaritzburg ran through hills that would have made the 4' 8 1/2" NRC gauge prohibitively expensive. Therefore, the 3' 6" (1067 mm) Cape gauge was used. Afterwards, the old NRC lines were replaced by ones with the new gauge. The building of the new line between The Point and Umgeni began on 11 May 1878.

The contract with the railway builders specified the minimum radius at 300 feet (91 m) and the maximum gradient at 1:30. Construction began on 1 January 1876. On 4 September 1878, the 27 km (17 mi) from Durban to Pinetown was operational, and on 1 December 1880, the entire line from Durban to Pietermaritzburg went online. Although the towns were 70 km (43 mi) apart, the railway stretched for 113 km (70 mi). The line climbed from sea level to Richmond Road (931 m above sea level) and then declined to Pietermaritzburg (633 m above sea level). The line followed the contours of the land and there was not one tunnel between the two cities. The current line between the two, by contrast, is 106 km (66 mi) long and goes through 15 tunnels.

=== Pietermaritzburg to Newcastle ===
While the Voortrekkers had mined coal on a small scale, the North Natal coal rush began in earnest when Frederick Noord published his report in 1881. A report by the British Empire (1871) reported that it cost twice as much to transport coal 40 miles (64 km) by wagon to Durban as it did to ship it 7,000 miles (11,000 km) to London. This, together with the opening of the diamond fields in Griqualand West, led the Natal Provincial Council to order the line continued to Newcastle in 1881 with a branch line connecting Natal to the diamond fields through the Drakensberg. After the line reached Ladysmith in 1886, service northward from Pietermaritzburg began. The distance from Pietermaritzburg to Ladysmith is 182 km (113 mi), and the line ranges 922 m (3,025 ft) from its highest point between Mooi River and Estcourt (1,570 m (5,150 ft) above sea level) to the bridge over the Tugela River (608 m (1,995 ft) above sea level).

Once the line from Ladysmith to Newcastle (127 km (79 mi)) was completed in 1889, coal could finally be transported economically from North Natal to the coast. A branch line (10 km (6.2 mi)) was also built from Glencoe to the coal mine in Dundee.

=== Connections with the Boer Republics ===
One of the original purposes of the Pietermaritzburg-Ladysmith line was to serve the diamond mines in Griqualand West. The same year the line reached Ladysmith, gold was discovered in the Witwatersrand, and therefore in 1889, it was decided to extend the line from Newcastle to the border of the Transvaal.

On 7 November 1889, after an agreement was reached between the governments of Natal and the Orange Free State, construction began on the line from Ladysmith to Harrismith. The line reached Van Reenen's Pass in 1891, and on 13 July 1892, service from Ladysmith to Harrismith was formally opened by the Governor of Natal and the State President of the Orange Free State. Although it stretched 37 km (23 mi) into the Orange River Colony, the entire length of the line (96 km (60 mi)) was the property of the NGR. The Free State portion was largely flat (between Van Reenen and Harrismith the line drops 60 m (200 ft)), but in Natal the line climbed 670 m (2,200 ft) over the course of 59 km (37 mi). Three zig zags were made to overcome the harsh terrain of the Drakensberg. Harrismith remained the terminus of the railway until after the Second Boer War. Between 1903 and 1906, the 255 km (158 mi) link between Harrismith and Kroonstad was opened in several stages.

After the discovery of gold, there was a race between Cape Colony and Natal to connect the Witwatersrand with the coast. Before the line from Ladysmith to Newcastle was completed, an agreement was signed between the governments of Natal and the ZAR to extend the line from Newcastle to the Rand. The line reached Newcastle on 15 May 1890, and was immediately continued on to Charlestown, the last town in Natal before the ZAR border. The line, which climbed 452 km (281 mi) over the 57 km (35 mi) from Newcastle to Charlestown, was formally opened by President Paul Kruger of the ZAR and the Governor of Natal on 7 April 1891. Where the line crosses Laing's Nek Pass, a 674 m (2,211 ft) tunnel was built.

For political reasons, the rail line was not connected with the Netherlands–South African Railway Company (NZASM) lines until the NZASM line to Maputo Bay was finished. That line went into service on 1 January 1895. By the terms of an agreement made on 3 February 1894 between the SAR government and NGR, the NGR was to build a 250 km (160 mi) link from the Natal-ZAR border to NZASM network. The first half, of 210 km (130 mi) from between the border and Heidelberg, Gauteng, opened 27 April 1895; the second opened on 15 November 1895. On 1 December 1895, the 4 km (2.5 mi) branch line between the border and Charlestown opened, followed on 15 December by the 41 km (25 mi) branch from Heidelberg to Union Junction, 9 km (5.6 mi) from Germiston.

=== Coast Line and branch lines ===
When the NGR was founded in 1875, it was authorized to build a 32 km (20 mi) line from Durban to Verulam along the northern coast and a 17 km (11 mi) line from Durban to Isipingo along the southern coast.

At the time, there was already a line from Durban to Umgeni, but it was in the 1,435 mm (4 ft 8 1/2 in) standard gauge of the NRC, not the 1,067 mm (3 ft 6 in) Cape gauge of the NGR. Since that line was already operational, it was retrofitted with a new Cape gauge track in 1877. In 1878, the 26 km (16 mi) extension of the North Coast Line to Verulam opened. The South Coast Line began near the Rossburgh station, a depot around 7 km (4.3 mi) from Durban. In 1880, the 10 km (6.2 mi) line to Isipingo opened.

The branch line from Glencoe to Dundee was the only one built in Natal before the colony attained self-government in 1893. Between then and the outbreak of the Second Boer War, the South Coast Line was extended 44 km (27 mi) from Isipingo to Park Rynie, a 10 km (6.2 mi) branch line was built along the southern border from the port of Clairwood to Wests, and a 27 km (17 mi) branch was built from Thornville Junction to Richmond. Around the same time, the Hullett sugar company extended the North Coast Line 88 km (55 mi) from Verulam to the southern bank of the Tugela River. On 25 October 1899, 13 days after the beginning of the Second Boer War, the first 48 km (30 mi) of the Pietermaritzburg-Greytown line (from Pietermaritzburg to New Hanover). Shortly after the British took Pretoria, the last 57 km (35 mi) from New Hanover to Greytown were completed. During the war, the South Coast Line was extended to North Shepstone on the northern bank of the Umzimkulu River, a distance of around 50 km (31 mi).

In 1896, JL Hullett & Sons bought the Natal-Zululand Company. Although Zululand was merged with the Colony of Natal in 1897, the Natal-Zululand Company continued to own the North Coast Line from Verulam northward, having leased the line to the NGR. On 18 July 1902, the first 71 km (44 mi) line opened, going from the Tugela River by way of Empangeni to near the Mhlathuze River. The following year, the line was extended 89 km (55 mi) by way of Mtubatuba to near the coal mine in Somkhele. The coal mined there was poor-quality and the mine was never profitable, so the line ran a deficit of £48,917 during its first year of operation. In April 1904, the government of Natal bought the line for £725,000.

Between 1904 and 1909, a 110 km (68 mi) link between the Natal portion of the NGR and the CGR lines in the Cape was built through Griqualand West. The line reached Riverside but was never finished.

In 1884, the Nieuwe Republiek was founded by Lucas Johannes Meyer with its capital at Vryheid. In 1888, the Nieuwe Republiek was absorbed into the ZAR, and in 1902 it was annexed by the British and combined with the Natal colony. The area is rich in coal. In April 1901, the Glencoe-Dundee branch line reached the Buffels River - earlier the border of the Nieuwe Republiek. From 1901 to 1909, the branch line was extended 98 km (61 mi) through Vryheid to near Hlobane. At the same time, Utrecht was connected with the main line by a 42 km (26 mi) branch line.

=== Narrow-gauge lines ===
During the 19th century, a number of narrow-gauge lines were built in the mountains. As in India and elsewhere, such lines were more financially viable in hilly terrain. Such lines included, for instance, the 2 ft (610 mm) Ffestiniog Railway in Wales and the Darjeeling Himalayan Railway in India.

In 1899, Hullett & Co. obtained permission from the Natal government to build a private 13 km (8.1 mi) narrow-gauge line from Stanger in the tea plantations to the Kearsney tea factory. The line opened to both freight and passengers on 13 March 1901.

In 1904, there were also narrow-gauge railways built in the Natal countryside. Narrow-gauge railways were cheaper than 1,067 mm (3 ft 6 in) and could also take sharper turns. The trade-off was that locomotives did not run as efficiently on them and therefore less could be hauled. The first narrow-gauge rail line in rural Natal, the 46 km (29 mi) Estcourt-Weenen line, opened in April 1907. The following year, the 151 km (94 mi) Ixopo-Stuartstown line opened between Donnybrook (a station on the Natal-Cape Line) and Umzinto (Esperanza, the terminus of a branch off the South Coast Line). The 44 km (27 mi) line between Umlaasweg and Mid-Illovo and the 39 km (24 mi) line from Port Shepstone to Paddock opened in 1911.

=== List of lines ===
The NGR lines established by 1 January 1912, are as follows:

Name	Terminus	Opening date (1st Portion/Remainder)	Miles	Km
Main line	Charlestown	1878/1895	309.25	498
North Coast Line	Somkhele	1898/1903	167.25	272
South Coast Line	South Shepstone	1901/1907	80.75	130
Bluff Line	Wests	1898	6.5	10
Richmond Line	Richmond	1897	17	27
Greytown Line	Greytown	1900	64.25	104
Natal Cape Line	Riverside	1909	106.75	172
Weenen Line (narrow-gauge)	Weenen	1907	28.75	46
Bo-Tugela Line	Winterton	1907	24	39
Main Line (Orange Free State)	Kroonstad	1892/1906	212.75	342
Glencoe-Hlobane Line	Hlobane	1889-1909	76.25	123
Stuartstown Line (narrow-gauge)	Donnybrook	1908	97	156
Utrecht Line	Utrecht	1910	29	47
Mid-Illovo Line (narrow-gauge)	Mid-Illovo	1911	28.5	46
Alfred County Line (narrow-gauge)	Paddock	1911	24.5	39
Howick Line	Howick	1911	2.75	4
Total			1276	2053

=== NGR locomotives ===
In 1875, when the NGR was founded, two wood-burning locomotives (1067 mm track) were ordered from the British firm Dübs and Company to replace locomotives from the NRC (1435 mm track). The locomotives were named the Durban and Pietermaritzburg and were eventually sold to the NZASM. In 1877, seven 2-6-0 locomotives of the same design were ordered from the firm Beyer, Peacock & Company. The first five were wood-fueled, but the last two used coal - the difference visible in the type of funnel. With the opening of the Durban-Pietermaritzburg line and the decision to extend it to Ladysmith, 37 4-6-0 locomotives were ordered from Kitson & Company. The locomotive had 40% more horsepower than the old 0-6-4 locomotives. In 1979 (a century later), one of the Kitson locomotives (NGR no. 13) was still in operation near the Rosherville power station.

1886 was an erratic year for the NGR. The opening of the Durban-Ladysmith line and the discovery of gold that year helped the NGR become a profitable company. New locomotives had to be ordered to serve the new line. A single 2-8-2 tank and tender locomotive was built by the NGR in Durban and began service in 1888. The locomotive was the first steam locomotive built in South Africa. At the same time, 100 4-8-2 locomotives were ordered from Dübs & Company. The locomotives came into service between 1888 and 1899. During the 1890s, these locomotives were the NGR's workhorses.

In the last years of the 19th century, traffic grew on the NGR, requiring more powerful locomotives. The 4-10-2 locomotive was designed by George William Reid, Locomotive Superintendent of the NGR, to achieve this task. To conquer the sharp switchbacks of the NGR, the front and rear wheels of the locomotive lacked flanges. The locomotive was heavier than a tender locomotive, giving it more horsepower. In honor of G.W. Reid, the locomotive was called the "Reid locomotive." Between 1899 and 1903, 101 of these locomotives were ordered. Derailment issues with the Reid "ten-wheelers" were eventually solved by removing the rear drive wheels from the locomotive, making it a 4-8-0 locomotive.

In the 1900s, the NGR began experimenting with tender locomotives. They were especially useful on the plains of northern Natal, the northern and southern coast, the Orange River Colony between Harrismith and Kroonstad, and in the Transvaal Colony from Volksrust to the Witwatersrand. In 1904, 50 4-8-0 "Hendrie B" locomotives were ordered from the North British Locomotive Company, and in 1909, 30 4-8-2 "Henrie D" locomotives were purchased from the same manufacturer (David Anderson Hendrie was the locomotive engineer of the NGR). In 1909, the NGR diversified further with the purchase of 6 Mallet locomotives from the American Locomotive Company. The Mallet locomotive was an articulated locomotive that could handle the sharp turns of the Natal Midlands and the Drakensberg. After 1912, South African Railways bought more Mallet-type locomotives, but after 1920, they were replaced by steam-powered Garratt locomotives or electric locomotives. Between 1907 and 1911, 287 km (178 mi) of narrow-gauge lines were reopened - 151 km (94 mi) between Donnybrook and Kelso and three smaller lines. All four lines used 4-6-2 locomotives.

In 1905, NGR classified its locomotives as classes "A" to "I," "K," and "N." "K" was reserved for various locomotives that did not fit into the other classes, and "N" was reserved for all narrow-gauge (610 mm) locomotives. The following year, the letter "L" was assigned to the locomotives ordered by the Central South African Railways. The classes are shown in the table below.

Year	Number	NGR Number	NGR Type	SAR Type	Force (kN)	Force (lbf)	Manufacturer
1875	2	Durban, Pietermaritzburg	2-6-0T		44	9800	Kitson & Company
1877	7	1-7, 501-507	Class K 2-6-0T		44	9800	Beyer, Peacock & Company
1879	37	8-14, 16-26, 29-47	Class G 4-6-0T	Class C	62	13850	Kitson & Company
1880	1	15	Class K 0-6-0ST		31	7020	Hunslet Engine Company
1888	1	48	2-8-2TT/4-6-2TT (Havelock)		64	14473	Natal Government Railways
1888	100	49-148	Class D 4-8-2T (Dubs "A")	Class A	83	18670	Dübs & Company
1890	5	89-93, 510-511	Class K 0-4-0ST		25	5526	Neilson & Company
1899	101	149-249	Class C 4-10-2T (Reid)	Class H	126	28430	Dübs & Company
1901	1	512	Class I 2-6-2T	Class I	34	7585	Baldwin Locomotive Works
1902	2	513, 514	Class I 2-6-0	Class I	51	11570	Baldwin Locomotive Works
1902	10	1-10	Class F 4-6-4T	Class E	222	15230	Neilson, Reid & Company
1904	25	250-274	Class E 4-8-2T	Class G	99	22280	North British Locomotive Company
1904	50	275-324	Class B 4-8-0 (Hendrie "B")	Class 1	140	31590	North British Locomotive Company
1905	2	325-326	Class A 4-6-2 (Hendrie "A")	Class 2	102	22940	North British Locomotive Company
1906	3	327-329	Class L 4-8-0	Class 7B	83.0	18660	Neilson, Reid & Company
1909	30	330-334, 345-369	Class B 4-8-2 (Hendrie "D")	Class 3	147	33150	North British Locomotive Company
1909	1	335	Class B 4-8-2 "American D"	Class 3A	162	36460	American Locomotive Company
1909	1	336	Mallet 2-6-6-0	Class MA	199	44810	American Locomotive Company
1910	4	337-341	Mallet 2-6-6-0	Class MB	199	44810	American Locomotive Company
1906	2	NG1, NG2	Class N 4-6-2T (narrow-gauge)	Class NG	36.3	8183	Hunslet Engine Company
1907	6	NG4-NG9	Class N 4-6-2T (narrow-gauge)	Class NG3	36.3	8183	Hawthorn Leslie & Company
1911	2	NG10, NG11	Class N 4-6-2T (narrow-gauge)	Class NG4	36.3	8183	Kerr, Stuart & Company

== Business operations ==
The NGR offered both passenger and freight service and also delivered letters and packages for the post office. The NGR operated at a loss during its early years, but after the Second Boer War, the NGR made around half of the Natal government's income.

In 1893 the company owned 91 locomotives, 231 coaches and 1451 goods wagons.

=== Industry facts and figures ===
The NGR was one of the Natal government's largest investments - around 30% of the Colony's debt was run up to build the lines, but between 1880 and 1910, the railways' income contributed 40-50% of the colonial government's revenues. The greatest driver of this growth was the extension of the rail lines to Johannesburg after gold was discovered there.

Performance Metric (£'000)	1881	1891	1898	1909
NGR net worth	£1,201	£4,528	£6,028	£14,161
NGR income	£173	£572	£986	£2,024
NGR expenses	£118	£372	£589	£1,187
NGR profit	£54	£200	£397	£837
Profit return on investment	4.5%	4.4%	6.5%	5.9%
Colonial income	£439	£1,355	£2,023	£4,126
NGR income/Colonial income	39.4%	42.2%	58.6%	49.0%
Colonial debt	£2,000	£7,170		£22,685
NGR investment/Colonial debt	60.0%	31.9%		31.0%

=== Passengers ===
NRC passenger services were taken over by the NGR in 1877. From 1 December 1880, onward, the NGR offered travel once a day between Durban and Pietermaritzburg. The journey from Durban to Pietermaritzburg lasted 6 hours and 14 minutes with an average speed of 18.1 km/h (11.2 mph), while the return to Durban lasted 5 hours and 45 minutes with an average speed of 19.6 km/h (12.2 mph). A first-class return ticket at first cost £29 9p, a second-class one £17 6p. In 1903, the cost was still around the same - £26 8p first-class and £17 9p second-class. A first-class ticket to Johannesburg cost £9-5-6 (R18.55) with its second-class equivalent priced at £6-14-0. According to the NGR handbook, there was no official racial discrimination. Harrison and Ingram, editors of the handbook, wrote of the service that it "caters for the requirements of first, second, and third class travellers, although the latter class is almost entirely monopolised by the coloured community." However, Mahatma Gandhi, as a young lawyer, was thrown off a first-class car in Pietermaritzburg in 1892 on account of his race, the turning point of his life.

From 1881 to 1889, the NGR averaged 400,000 passengers a year. With the opening of the line to the border of the ZAR, the figure rose to 600,000, and the opening of the line from Durban to the Rand drove numbers to almost 1.2 million. After the Second Boer War, around 2.5 to 3 million passengers a year used the NGR.

=== Freight ===
Initially, NGR trains carried both freight and passengers. In the early years of the NGR, sugar and coal were the most important goods. After the discovery of gold, consumer goods carried between the Port of Durban and the Rand made up one of the leading uses of the NGR. Around the same time, the transport of agricultural products, especially acacia trees shipped to the Witwatersrand mines, grew by leaps and bounds. Between 1970 and 1909, the amount of cultivated land increased dramatically. In 1870, 736 km^{2} (284 mi^{2}) of land were cultivated, but in 1891 1,580 km^{2} (610 mi^{2}), of which 343 km^{2} (132 mi^{2}) was owned by whites, were being farmed, and in 1909 that number rose to 4,020 km^{2} (1,550 mi^{2}), of which 2,190 km^{2} (850 mi^{2}) was owned by whites.

==== Sugar ====
One of the main purposes of the line from Durban to The Point was to carry sugar. Although sugarcane (umoba in Zulu) was known to the Zulu, they did not grow it. In 1847, 40,000 sugarcane seedlings were imported from Mauritius and Réunion. The settlers experimented with several varieties. Commercial cultivation of sugarcane began in 1850 with the tilling of 20 ha (49 acres). By 1859, 1,664 ha (4,110 acres) were under cultivation. Between 1854 and 1858, before the first railway was built, Natal exported on average 41 tons of sugar a year. Between 1859 and 1863 (when the NRC's first line was built), the annual output grew 25-fold to 1,103 tons. Between 1884 and 1888, after the North Coast and South Coast Lines were built, the annual export multiplied tenfold to 11,370 tons.

==== Coal ====
In 1840, the members of the Beeskommando under the leadership of Andries Pretorius used local coal to fuel their campfires. In 1860, the Talana Colliery opened on Coalfields farm near the town of Dundee. Thomas Paterson Smith used this coal to manufacture his own bricks.

In 1889, the line from Ladysmith to Newcastle was completed, and a private branch line was built from Glencoe to Dundee. In 1889, the Dundee Coal Company was founded with the NGR as its biggest customer. At the same time, another mine was established near the railway in Elandslaagte (25 km (16 mi) north of Ladysmith). In 1898, the first coal was mined in Vryheid, but the city had to wait until 1906 for the line to arrive. In 1908, the line reached Hlobane, and its mine was opened the following year.

The expansion of the railways fostered immense growth in the Natal coal industry. In 1889, production came to 25,609 tons, but by 1909 it had reached 1,669,583 tons. In 1908, the largest users of coal were the ships that carried 800,000 tons of coal a year out of Durban. The railway itself used 250,000 tons, and other local users consumed 150,000 tons. By then, the export trade had developed significantly - in 1908, 446,915 tons of coal were shipped out of Natal, either overseas or to neighboring states.

==== Acacia ====
Black wattle Acacia mearnsii is one of the main crops of the so-called "mistbelt forest" of Natal, a region lying between 1,000–1,500 m (3,300–4,900 ft) above sea level. The bark of the wattle was used to make tannin for the leather industry. The wattle wood was also used for mine pillars on the Rand. The first wattle seeds were imported from Australia in the 1860s. Initially, it was planted as a shade tree on farms, but George Sutton recognized its commercial growth potential in 1876. Wattle bark was first exported to England in 1886, and the 10 tons exported the following year fetched a good price. By 1910, 60,000 km^{2} (23,000 mi^{2}) were planted with the tree, and 24,000 tons were harvested that year.

This growth was made possible by the construction of rail lines to the planted areas, especially the 104 km (65 mi) Greytown Line (built 1899-1900) and the 172 km (107 mi) Natal-Cape Line (built 1904-1909). These railways brought the majority of the wattle crop to the main Natal line.

==== Farm towns ====
The Natal Agricultural Development Act of 1904 made crown lands available for purchase by farmers at favorable rates. The legislation was geared toward promoting agriculture for food self-sufficiency in the colony as well as to grow crops for export, particularly to the Rand. Farming towns were established, among other areas, around Weenen, Winterton, and Illovo. Irrigation was set up near Winterton and Weenen. New railway was built at the same time by the Natal government, including the Bo-Tugela Line connecting Winterton to the main line and the narrow-gauge Weenen and Mid-Illovo Lines doing the same for those villages. Another narrow-gauge track, the 122.2 km (75.9 mi) Alfred County Line, was authorized to connect Harding with the South Coast Line, built in two sections: the first went 39.2 km (24.4 mi) from Port Shepstone to Paddock and was ordered by the Natal government in 1909 (finished in 1911), the second 83 km (52 mi) the rest of the way ordered by the government of the Union of South Africa in 1913 (finished in 1915).

== War ==
The NGR transported British soldiers from Durban to Camperdown during the Anglo-Zulu War (1879) and to Pietermaritzburg during the First Boer War (1881). In both cases, they made the rest of their journey to the battlefield by horse or by wagon. One of the key goals of Natal during the Second Boer War (1899-1902) was control over the rail line between Durban and the ZAR and Orange Free State.

Until 1899, the British had no experience with maintaining rail service in a war zone, especially in terms of the relationship between military planners and civilian railway personnel. If, in October 1899, the British Army had destroyed the Laing's nek tunnel, for instance, the course of the Natal campaign would have gone quite differently.

In the two months before the outbreak of the Second Boer War, 10,000 British soldiers arrived in Durban to reinforce the 2,000 already there. They were deployed by train to Ladysmith and Dundee. The war broke out on 12 October 1899, and on 30 October (after the Battle of Nicholson's Nek, half the British forces retreated south of the Tugela while the other half were besieged in Ladysmith. During October, November, and December 1899, the NGR sent 43,296 soldiers, 11,479 animals, 96 cannons, and 377 vehicles together with 19,499 tons of supplies from the coast to the battlefields.

The Boer forces, with the help of NZASM engineers, took control of the NGR line north of Ladysmith with a de facto terminus at Modderfontein (10 km (6.2 mi) north of Ladysmith), while Estcourt became the de facto terminus of the British section of the line. The British sent armored trains toward the Tugela to support their scouts. One of the trains was attacked by a Boer Commando unit near Chievely, in the same raid in which then-journalist Winston Churchill was taken prisoner.

After Ladysmith was relieved, the Boer armies retreated over the Biggarsberg, and for two months they kept hold of the northern portion of the railway. During that time, Paul Kruger took a train ride to encourage Boer soldiers in Glencoe. When the Boers retreated, they damaged many bridges and tunnels, especially the bridge over the Tugela and the Laing's Nek tunnel.

The hallmark of the last phase of the war was the Boer forces' guerrilla warfare and the British forces' building of blockhouses to counter these techniques. Blockhouses were built along three NGR lines - the line between Van Reenen and Harrismith (in Free State territory), the line between Glencoe and Utrecht, and the line between Newcastle and the ZAR border.

Despite the war, the NGR expansion program continued all the while, especially on the South Coast Line.

== Union of South Africa ==
On 31 May 1910, the Union of South Africa was founded. One of the main controversies leading up to Union was the ownership and operation of the railways. Natal voters feared that if Natal did not join the Union, Durban-based trade would shift to Delagoa Bay. Natal thus supported unification. On 1 January 1912, the Natal Government Railways, Cape Government Railways, and Central South African Railways merged with the ports of various cities to form South African Railways and Harbours (SARH).

Between 31 May 1910, and 31 December 1911, the NGR opened an 87.3 km (54.2 mi) rail line (83.4 km (51.8 mi) of it narrow-gauge). Construction of this line was completed by the Natal government in 1906. In 1912, D.A. Hendrie, chief engineer of the NGR, became chief engineer of SARH. He continued experimenting with Mallet locomotives. In 1919, the first Garratt steam locomotive went into service on the former NGR railways, and the main line began electrifying in 1923.

== See also ==
- South African "Natal" 0-4-0WT
- South African Class A 4-8-2T
- South African Class H 4-10-2T
- South African Class H2 4-8-2T
- Rail transport in South Africa
