= 1911 in South Africa =

- Decades: 1890s; 1900s; 1910s; 1920s; 1930s
- See also: List of years in South Africa

The following lists events that happened during 1911 in South Africa.

== Incumbents ==
- Monarch: King George V.
- Governor-General and High Commissioner for Southern Africa: The Viscount Gladstone.
- Prime Minister: Louis Botha.
- Chief Justice: John de Villiers, 1st Baron de Villiers

== Events ==
April

- 18 – Lusitania, a Portuguese 5,557 ton passenger liner, strikes Bellows Rock just off Cape Point en route from Mozambique to Lisbon and sinks. Only 8 out of the 774 people on board lose their lives.
- 22 – A passenger train from Port Alfred derails on the Blaauwkrantz Bridge and plunges into the ravine 200 feet (61 metres) below, killing 31 and seriously injuring 23.

November

- Louis Botha and J.B.M. Hertzog officially establish the South African Party as the "South African National Party" in Bloemfontein, although the Party had already been supported informally by candidates in national elections the year prior.

== Births ==
- 8 January – Esther Susanna Mentz, soprano and actress.
- 6 August – Norman Gordon, cricketer (d. 2014)
- 25 September –Lillian Ngoyi, "Ma Ngoyi", dressmaker, political activist and trade unionist.

== Deaths ==
- 4 February – Piet Cronjé, Boer General. (b. 1836)
- 28 May – Ds. S.J. du Toit, pioneer of the Afrikaans language. (b. 1847)
- 23 November – Bernard Tancred, South African cricketer. (b. 1865)

== Railways ==
=== Railway lines opened ===
- 1 March – Transvaal – India Junction to Alberton, 3 miles 51 chains (5.9 kilometres).
- 13 April – Natal – Umlaas Road to Mid Illovo (Narrow gauge), 27 miles 35 chains (44.2 kilometres).
- 11 May – Transvaal – Welverdiend to Lichtenburg, 79 miles 77 chains (128.7 kilometres).
- 31 May – Cape – Eendekuil to Graafwater, 48 miles 10 chains (77.4 kilometres).
- 2 July – Transvaal – Welgedag to Modderbee, 6 miles 69 chains (11.0 kilometres).
- 31 July – Transvaal – Ermelo to Piet Retief, 70 miles 13 chains (112.9 kilometres).
- 15 August – Transvaal – Pietersburg to Bandelierkop, 71 miles 8 chains (114.4 kilometres).
- 21 August – Cape – Hopefield to Bergrivier (Narrow gauge), 10 miles 50 chains (17.1 kilometres).
- 4 September – Free State – Sannaspos to Jammerdrif, 53 miles 60 chains (86.5 kilometres).

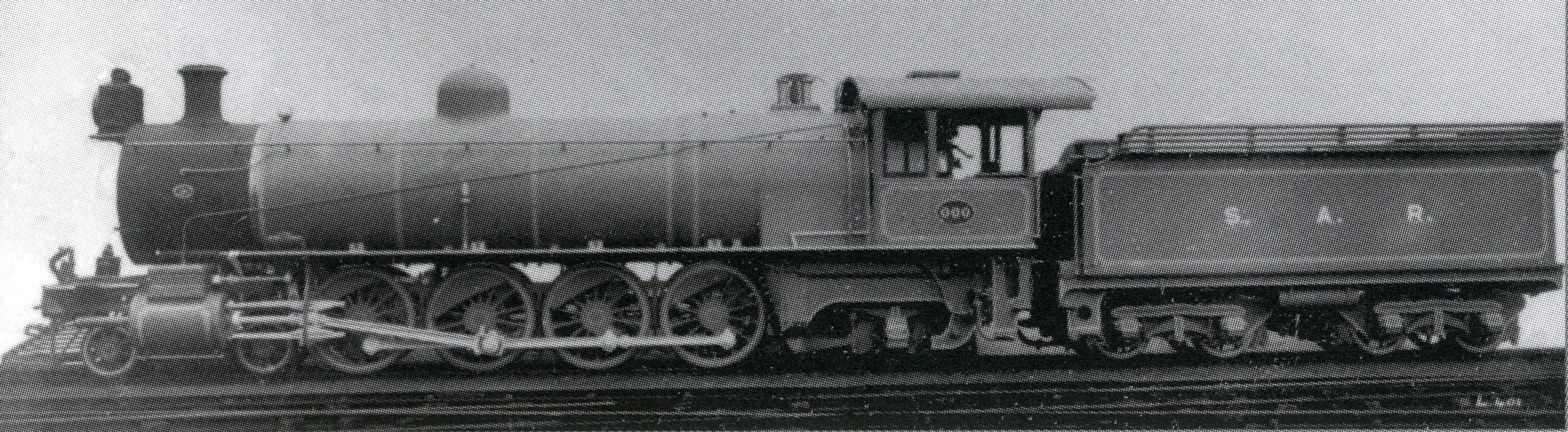
SAR Class 4

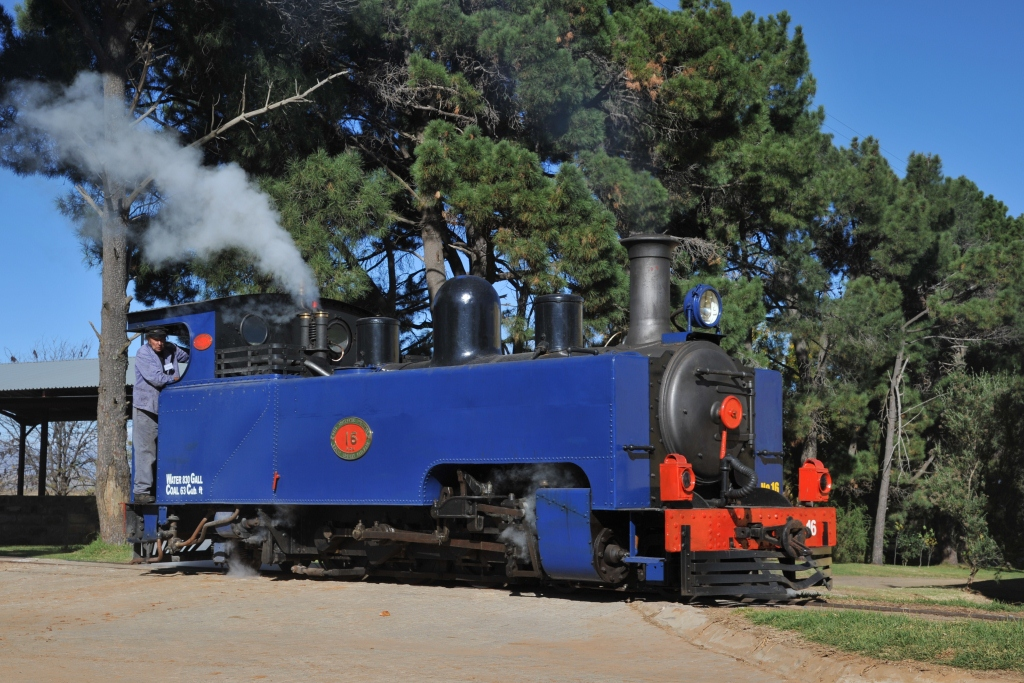
SAR Class NG4

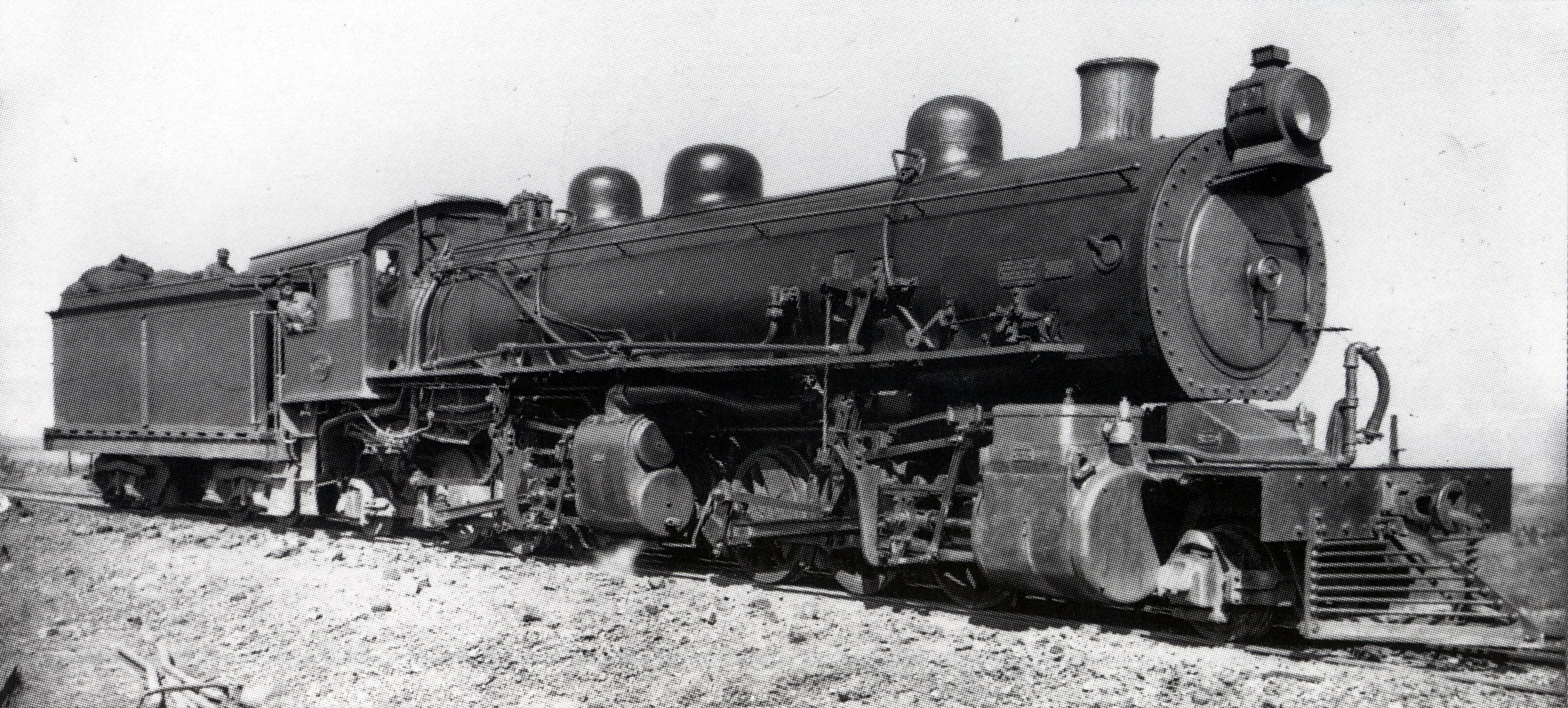
SAR Class MF

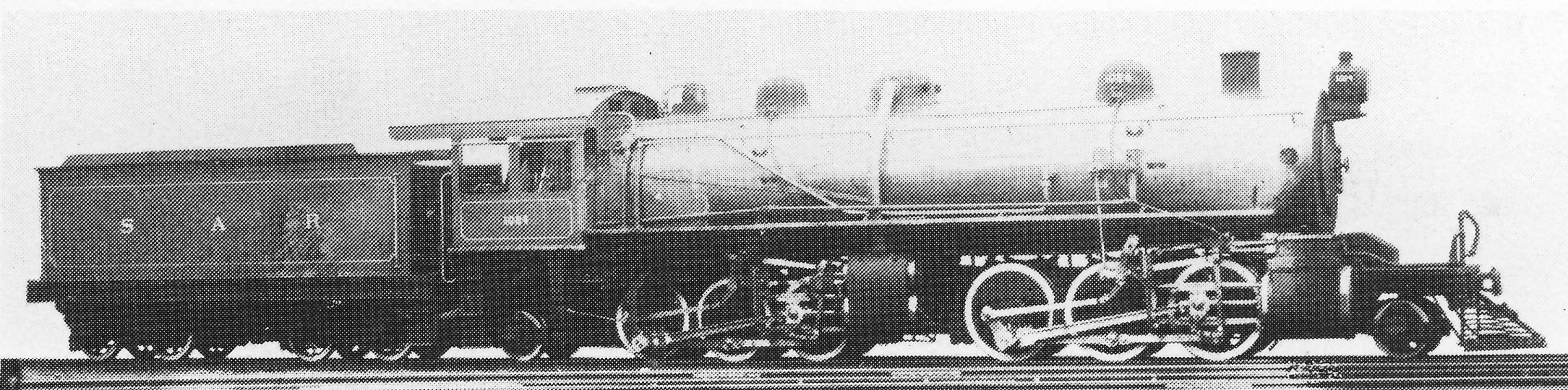
SAR Class MG

- 7 October – Natal – Merrivale to Howick, 2 miles 36 chains (3.9 kilometres).
- 8 November – Natal – Port Shepstone to Paddock (Narrow gauge), 24 miles 30 chains (39.2 kilometres).
- 1 December – Cape – Lady Grey to Melk, 9 miles 77 chains (16.0 kilometres).
- 2 December – Free State – Bethlehem to Reitz, 35 miles 45 chains (57.2 kilometres).
- 4 December – Transvaal – Coligny to Delareyville, 61 miles 40 chains (99.0 kilometres).

=== Locomotives ===
Cape

- The Cape Government Railways places two 4-8-2 Mountain steam locomotives in service. In 1912 they will be designated Class 4 on the South African Railways (SAR).

Natal

- The Natal Government Railways places the first two of seven 4-6-2 Pacific narrow gauge tank steam locomotives in service. On the SAR they will become the Class NG4.

Transvaal

Two new Cape gauge locomotive types enter service on the Central South African Railways (CSAR):

- Nine 2-6-6-2 Mallet articulated compound steam locomotives. In 1912 they will be designated Class MF by the SAR.
- A single experimental 2-6-6-2 Mallet. In 1912 it will become the sole Class MG on the SAR.
