= Southern Pacific class MM-2 =

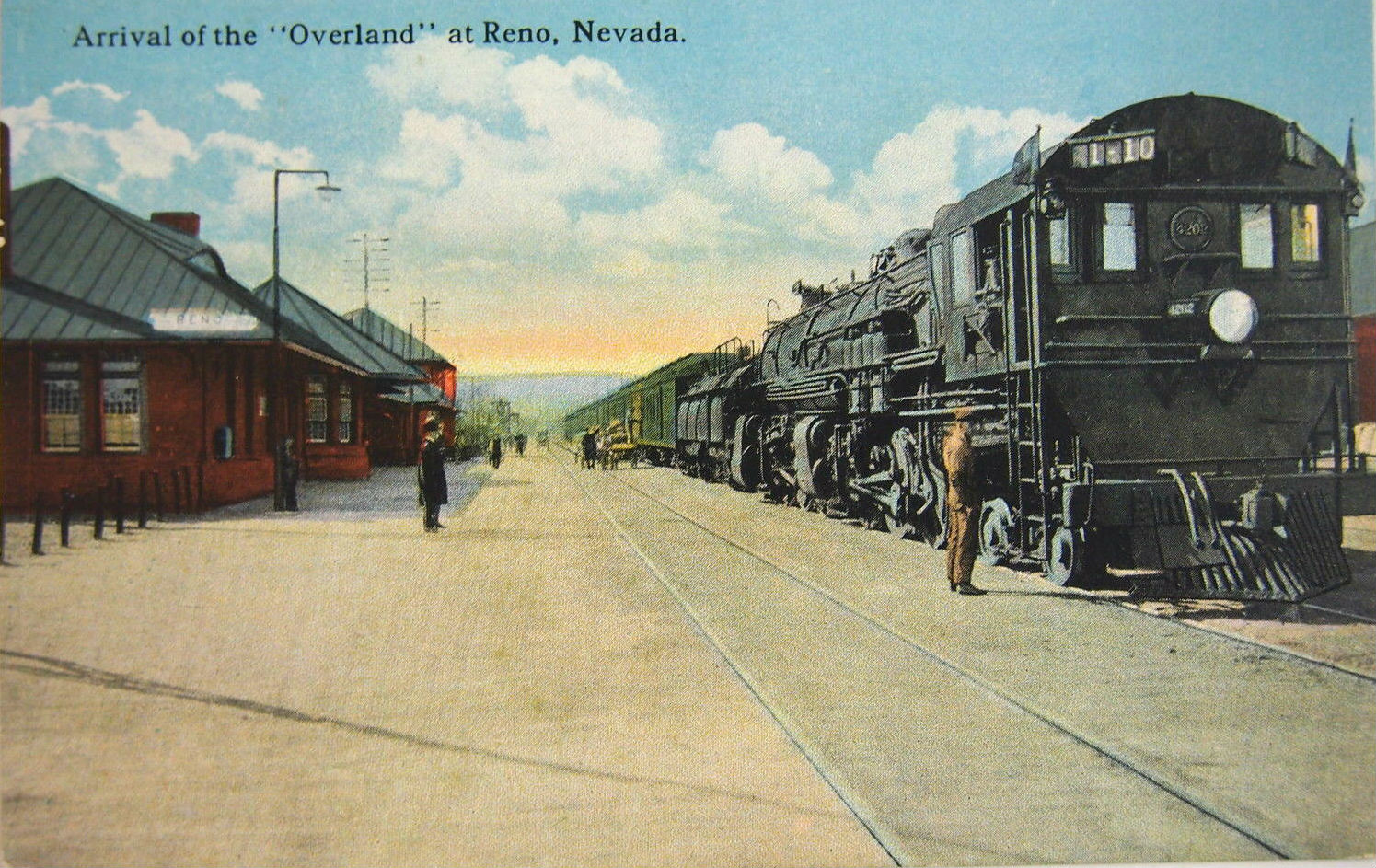
Type and origin
- Power type: Steam
- Builder: Baldwin Locomotive Works
- Serial number: 36684, 36685, 36687–36689, 36703–36705, 36726, 36727, 36740, 36783
- Build date: July–August 1911
Specifications
- Configuration
  - Whyte: New: 2-6-6-2. Now: 4-6-6-2
  - UIC: New: 1′C(C1′) n4v Now: 2'C(C1') n4v
- Gauge: 4 ft 8 1/2 in (1,435 mm) standard gauge
- Driver dia.: 63 in (1,600 mm)
- Adhesive weight: 320,100 lb (145,200 kg; 145.2 t)
- Loco weight: 384,800 lb (174,500 kg; 174.5 t)
- Total weight: 568,000 lb (258,000 kg; 258 t)
- Fuel type: Fuel oil
- Fuel capacity: 3,200 US gal (12,000 L; 2,700 imp gal)
- Water cap.: 10,000 US gal (38,000 L; 8,300 imp gal)
- Firebox
  - Grate area: 70 sq ft (6.5 m^{2})
- Boiler pressure: 200 psi (1.38 MPa)
- Feedwater heater: 4B Worthington
- Heating surface: 5,292 sq ft (491.6 m^{2})
- Superheater: None
- Cylinders: Four: two high pressure (rear), two low pressure (front)
- High-pressure cylinder: 25 in × 28 in (635 mm × 711 mm)
- Low-pressure cylinder: 38 in × 28 in (965 mm × 711 mm)
- Valve gear: Walschaerts
Performance figures
- Tractive effort: 74,070 lbf (329.48 kN)
Career
- Operators: Southern Pacific Company
- Class: MM-2
- Numbers: 4200 – 4211 (MM-2), renumbered 3900 – 3911 (AM-2)
- First run: September 19, 1911
- Retired: 1946 – 1948
- Disposition: All scrapped

Southern Pacific Company's MM-2 class of steam locomotives was one of Southern Pacific's (SP) only classes of 2-6-6-2 "Mallet" type steam locomotives ordered and built as oil-fired cab forward locomotives. They were built in 1911 as compound-expansion Mallet locomotives by Baldwin Locomotive Works and entered service on SP beginning September 19, 1911. By 1914, they had all been upgraded with an additional leading axle making them 4-6-6-2 locomotives, reclassified from MM-2 to AM-2. This was done to improve handling at speed. These locomotives were the predecessors of several other cab-forward engines, culminating in the AC-12 class cab forward locomotives built during World War II.

SP used these locomotives in the Sierra Nevada for about 20 years, retiring them in the mid-1930s. They were stored in the railroad's Sacramento, California, shops for a couple years before being rebuilt with 4B Worthington feedwater heaters and uniform cylinders (making them simple-expansion them) measuring 22 in × 28 in (559 mm × 711 mm), diameter × stroke. The rebuilds increased the class weight to 424,200 lb (192,400 kg) with 356,900 lb (161,900 kg) on the drivers, 210 psi (1.4 MPa) boiler pressure and 76,800 lbf (342 kN) tractive effort.

The rebuilt locomotives were renumbered into the 3900 series then used on SP's Portland Division in Oregon until they were again retired in the late 1940s. The locomotives were all scrapped soon after retirement with the last, 3907 (originally 4207), on September 23, 1948.
