= 2662 =

2662 may refer to:

- 2-6-6-2, a Whyte notation classification of steam locomotive
- 2662 Kandinsky, a minor planet
- 2662 AD/CE in the 27th century
