= South African Class MG 2-6-6-2 =

1911 articulated steam locomotive

CSAR Mallet 2-6-6-2 Stoker South African Class MG 2-6-6-2
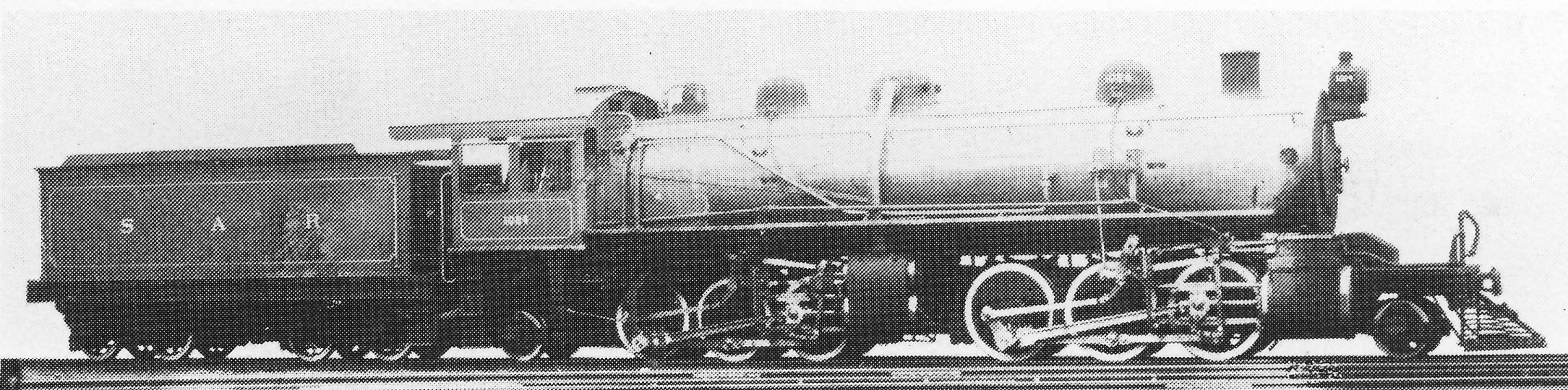
- SAR no. 1628, ex CSAR no. 1024, c. 1912
Type and origin
- Power type: Steam
- Designer: American Locomotive Company
- Builder: American Locomotive Company
- Serial number: 49124
- Model: CSAR Mallet
- Build date: 1911
- Total produced: 1
Specifications
- Configuration
  - Whyte: 2-6-6-2 (Prairie Mallet)
  - UIC: (1'C)C1'nv4
- Driver: 3rd & 6th coupled axles
- Gauge: 3 ft 6 in (1,067 mm) Cape gauge
- Leading dia.: 28 1/2 in (724 mm)
- Coupled dia.: 51 in (1,295 mm) front unit 46 in (1,168 mm) rear unit
- Trailing dia.: 28 1/2 in (724 mm)
- Tender wheels: 34 in (864 mm)
- Wheelbase: 66 ft 9 in (20,345 mm)
  - Engine: 41 ft 6 in (12,649 mm)
  - Coupled: 9 ft 2 in (2,794 mm) front unit 8 ft 4 in (2,540 mm) rear unit
  - Tender: 17 ft 11 in (5,461 mm)
  - Tender bogie: 4 ft 7 in (1,397 mm)
- Length
  - Over couplers: 74 ft 10 1/4 in (22,816 mm)
- Height: 12 ft 10 7/8 in (3,934 mm)
- Frame type: Bar
- Axle load: 15 LT 3 cwt 2 qtr (15.42 t)
  - Leading: 7 LT 11 cwt 2 qtr (7.697 t)
  - 1st coupled: 14 LT 6 cwt (14.53 t)
  - 2nd coupled: 14 LT 14 cwt 2 qtr (14.96 t)
  - 3rd coupled: 14 LT 14 cwt 2 qtr (14.96 t)
  - 4th coupled: 14 LT 14 cwt 2 qtr (14.96 t)
  - 5th coupled: 14 LT 14 cwt 2 qtr (14.96 t)
  - 6th coupled: 15 LT 3 cwt 2 qtr (15.42 t)
  - Tender bogie: 25 LT 8 cwt 2 qtr (25,830 kg) each
  - Tender axle: 12 LT 14 cwt 1 qtr (12,920 kg) av.
- Adhesive weight: 88 LT 7 cwt 2 qtr (89.79 t)
- Loco weight: 103 LT 2 cwt (104.8 t)
- Tender weight: 50 LT 17 cwt (51.67 t)
- Total weight: 153 LT 19 cwt (156.4 t)
- Tender type: 2-axle bogies
- Fuel type: Coal
- Fuel capacity: 10 LT (10.2 t)
- Water cap.: 4,000 imp gal (18,200 L)
- Firebox
  - Type: Round-top
  - Grate area: 49.5 sq ft (4.60 m^{2})
- Boiler
  - Pitch: 7 ft 11 1/2 in (2,426 mm)
  - Diameter: 6 ft 1/8 in (1,832 mm)
  - Tube plates: 20 ft 4 1/8 in (6,201 mm)
  - Small tubes: 269 2 1/4 in (57 mm)
- Boiler pressure: 200 psi (1,379 kPa)
- Safety valve: Ramsbottom
- Heating surface
  - Firebox: 160.5 sq ft (14.91 m^{2})
  - Tubes: 3,223 sq ft (299.4 m^{2})
  - Total surface: 3,383.5 sq ft (314.34 m^{2})
- Cylinders: Four
- High-pressure cylinder: 18 in (457 mm) bore 26 in (660 mm) stroke
- Low-pressure cylinder: 28 1/2 in (724 mm) bore 28 in (711 mm) stroke
- Valve gear: Walschaerts
- Couplers: Johnston link-and-pin
Performance figures
- Tractive effort: 45,200 lbf (201 kN) @ 50%
Career
- Operators: Central South African Railways; South African Railways
- Class: Class MG
- Number in class: 1
- Numbers: CSAR 1024, SAR 1628
- Delivered: 1911
- First run: 1911
- Withdrawn: 1927

The South African Railways Class MG 2-6-6-2 of 1911 was a steam locomotive from the pre-Union era in Transvaal.

In 1911, the Central South African Railways placed an experimental Mallet articulated compound steam locomotive with a 2-6-6-2 wheel arrangement in service. In 1912, when it was assimilated into the South African Railways, it was renumbered and designated the sole member of Class MG.

== Manufacturer ==
A single experimental locomotive was included with the order for nine Class MF Mallet articulated compound steam locomotives which were delivered to the Central South African Railways (CSAR) by the American Locomotive Company (ALCO) in 1911.

It was similar to the other nine engines, but used saturated instead of superheated steam, had a mechanical stoker and the coupled wheels on the leading engine unit were 5 inches (127 millimetres) larger than those of the trailing unit. It had Walschaerts valve gear and was numbered 1024.

== Compound expansion ==
In a compound locomotive, steam is expanded in phases. After being expanded in a high-pressure cylinder and having then lost pressure and given up part of its heat, it is exhausted into a larger-volume low-pressure cylinder for secondary expansion, after which it is exhausted through the smokebox. By comparison, in the more usual arrangement of simple expansion (simplex), steam is expanded just once in any one cylinder before being exhausted through the smokebox.

In the compound Mallet locomotive, the rear set of coupled wheels are driven by the smaller high-pressure cylinders, which are fed steam from the steam dome. Their spent steam is then fed to the larger low-pressure cylinders, which drive the front set of coupled wheels.

== Characteristics ==
Apart from having a different boiler, there were three major differences between this locomotive and the nine Class MF engines which were built and delivered at the same time.

=== Saturated steam ===
It was not equipped with a superheater, although superheated locomotives had already been proven to be more economic and superior in performance. Since steam did not have to be routed via a superheater, it was led vertically down from the dome directly to the high-pressure cylinders.

=== Coupled wheels ===
The front set of coupled wheels was of a larger diameter than the rear set. In theory, this configuration was to result in improved acceleration with the rear engine unit providing the traction. It was also believed that the difference in frequency between the front and rear cylinder exhaust beats would result in a more even pressure in the receiver pipe and therefore improved steam flow, although exactly how this was to come about was not clear. It was the only South African articulated locomotive to have coupled wheels of different diameters.

Owing to the larger diameter wheels of the front engine unit, the boiler pitch had to be raised to 7 feet 11 1/2 inches (2,426 millimetres), the highest pitched boiler in South Africa at the time.

The unorthodox driving wheel configuration did not have the expected results and in comparison with the other nine superheated engines, the locomotive proved to be inferior in performance.

=== Mechanical stoker ===
This was the first South African locomotive to be equipped with a mechanical stoker. This device was of the Street type and consisted of a coal crusher, hand-fed by the fireman, which was fitted to the front left hand side of the tender footplate. The crusher was driven by a small steam engine which was mounted behind the hand brake column.

The crusher reduced the coal to a suitable size for the stoker. The crushed coal then fell by gravity into a chute which led to a receiving bin, fitted below the back buffer beam of the locomotive. From here it was picked up by a bucket elevator which worked in a large pipe. The full buckets were carried up in the left-hand-side tube mounted on the back of the firebox, discharged into a central receiver and then travelled empty down the right hand side tube.

The bucket belt was driven by another small steam engine mounted on the left side of the firebox, near the top. The main shaft of this engine had adjustable cams which operated three steam cocks that supplied steam jets to the coal delivery orifices. From the central receiver, a cone-shaped tray directed the coal to the right, centre or left sides as required, while the cam-operated steam jets blew the coal into the firebox. When coal was only required at the back end of the firebox, the cams could be projected a short distance, thereby allowing steam jets of just sufficient power to project the coal to the required parts of the firebox.

It was a very complicated, cumbersome and extremely noisy arrangement which required the fireman to attend to two auxiliary engines and feed the crusher in addition to his normal duties. The noise created by this mechanism was stated to be deafening to the crew and was threefold, first the noise of the crusher, then the noisy circulation of the conveyor buckets, and finally the sharp reports of the steam jets which controlled the feeding.

The mechanical stoker was removed and the locomotive was converted to hand firing soon after being placed in service.

== Service ==
When the Union of South Africa was established on 31 May 1910, the three Colonial government railways (Cape Government Railways, Natal Government Railways and CSAR) were united under a single administration to control and administer the railways, ports and harbours of the Union. Although the South African Railways and Harbours came into existence in 1910, with Sir William Hoy appointed as its first General Manager, the actual classification and renumbering of all the rolling stock of the three constituent railways were only implemented with effect from 1 January 1912.

In 1912, this locomotive was renumbered 1628 and designated Class MG on the South African Railways (SAR). It joined the experimental Class MD and the Class MF on the coal traffic line between Witbank and Germiston, where it remained until it was withdrawn from service in 1927.

== Illustration ==
The main picture shows Class MG number 1628 in its original lined SAR livery. It was later repainted in the more well-known plain black SAR livery.

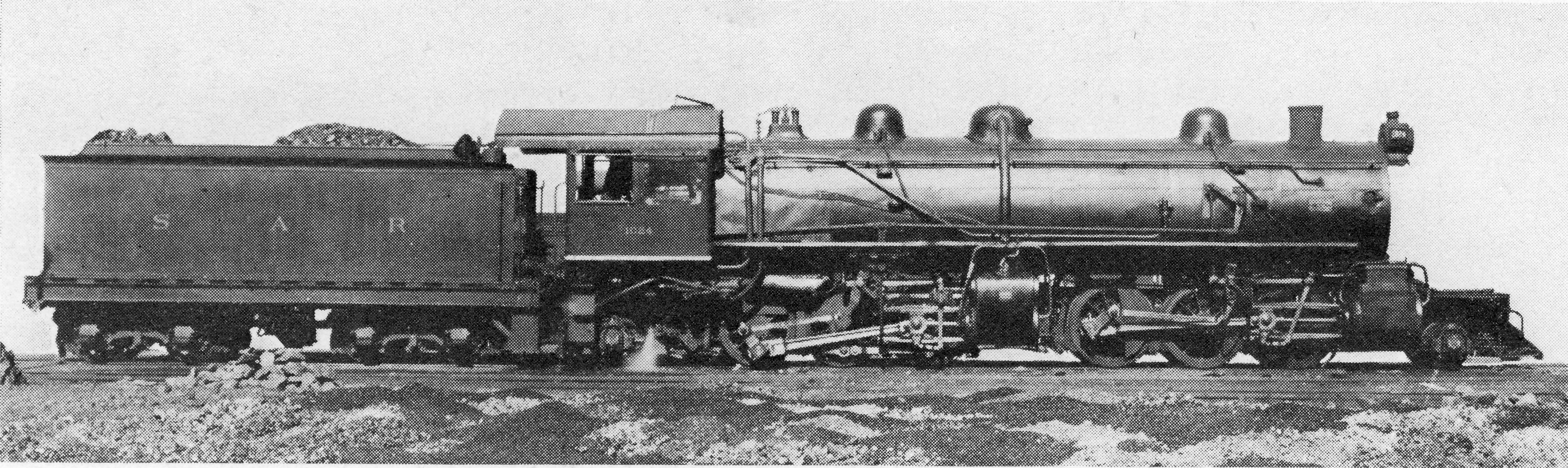
No. 1628 in plain black SAR livery, c. 1920
