= South African Class MF 2-6-6-2 =

1911 articulated steam locomotive

CSAR Mallet 2-6-6-2 Superheated South African Class MF 2-6-6-2
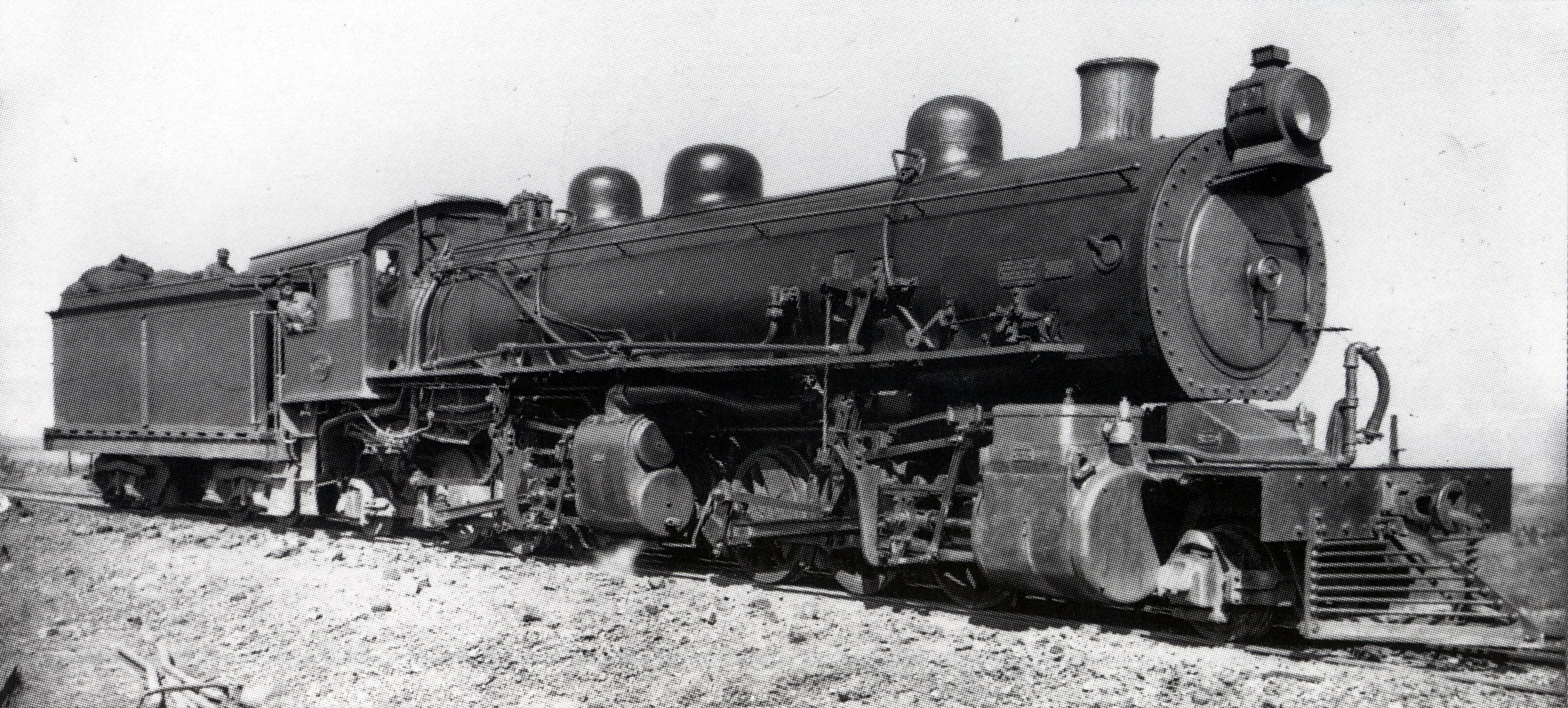
- SAR no. 1620, ex CSAR no. 1016, c. 1920
Type and origin
- ♠ Locomotive numbers 1619-1627 ♥ Locomotive numbers 1629-1633
- Power type: Steam
- Designer: American Locomotive Company
- Builder: American Locomotive Company
- Serial number: 49115-49123, 50039-50043
- Model: CSAR Mallet
- Build date: 1910–1911
- Total produced: 14
Specifications
- Configuration
  - Whyte: 2-6-6-2 (Prairie Mallet)
  - UIC: (1'C)C1'hv4 compound (1'C)C1'h4 simplex
- Driver: 3rd & 6th coupled axles
- Gauge: 3 ft 6 in (1,067 mm) Cape gauge
- Leading dia.: 28 1/2 in (724 mm)
- Coupled dia.: 46 in (1,168 mm)
- Trailing dia.: 28 1/2 in (724 mm)
- Tender wheels: ♠ 34 in (864 mm) ♥ 30 in (762 mm)
- Wheelbase: ♠ 65 ft 6 in (19,964 mm)
  - Engine: 40 ft 3 in (12,268 mm)
  - Coupled: 8 ft 4 in (2,540 mm) per unit
  - Tender: ♠ 17 ft 11 in (5,461 mm) ♥ 17 ft 10 in (5,436 mm)
  - Tender bogie: ♠ 4 ft 7 in (1,397 mm) ♥ 5 ft 10 in (1,778 mm)
- Length
  - Over couplers: ♠ 73 ft 7 1/4 in (22,435 mm)
- Height: 12 ft 10 3/8 in (3,921 mm)
- Frame type: Bar
- Axle load: 15 LT 3 cwt (15,390 kg)
  - Leading: 7 LT 12 cwt (7,722 kg)
  - 1st coupled: 14 LT 14 cwt (14,940 kg)
  - 2nd coupled: 14 LT 3 cwt (14,380 kg)
  - 3rd coupled: 13 LT 19 cwt (14,170 kg)
  - 4th coupled: 15 LT 3 cwt (15,390 kg)
  - 5th coupled: 14 LT 15 cwt (14,990 kg)
  - 6th coupled: 14 LT 15 cwt (14,990 kg)
  - Trailing: 7 LT 12 cwt (7,722 kg)
  - Tender bogie: ♠ 27 LT 12 cwt (28,040 kg) each ♥ 25 LT 10 cwt (25,910 kg) av.
  - Tender axle: ♠ 13 LT 16 cwt (14,020 kg) ♥ 12 LT 15 cwt (12,950 kg) av.
- Adhesive weight: 87 LT 9 cwt (88,850 kg)
- Loco weight: 102 LT 13 cwt (104,300 kg)
- Tender weight: ♠ 55 LT 4 cwt (56,090 kg) ♥ 51 LT (51,820 kg)
- Total weight: ♠ 157 LT 17 cwt (160,400 kg) ♥ 153 LT 13 cwt (156,100 kg)
- Tender type: ♠ XS (2-axle bogie) ♥ XM4 (2-axle bogie)
- Fuel type: Coal
- Fuel capacity: ♠♥ 10 LT (10.2 t)
- Water cap.: ♠ 5,000 imp gal (22,700 L) ♥ 4,000 imp gal (18,200 L)
- Firebox
  - Type: Round-top
  - Grate area: 49.5 ft^{2} (4.60 m^{2})
- Boiler
  - Pitch: 7 ft 9 in (2,362 mm)
  - Diameter: 6 ft 1/8 in (1,832 mm)
  - Tube plates: 19 ft 10 1/8 in (6,048 mm)
  - Small tubes: 151: 2 1/4 in (57 mm)
  - Large tubes: 25: 5 3/8 in (137 mm)
- Boiler pressure: 200 psi (1,379 kPa)
- Safety valve: Ramsbottom
- Heating surface
  - Firebox: 156 ft^{2} (14.5 m^{2})
  - Tubes: 2,459.6 ft^{2} (228.50 m^{2})
  - Total surface: 2,615.6 ft^{2} (243.00 m^{2})
- Superheater
  - Type: Schmidt
  - Heating area: 559 ft^{2} (51.9 m^{2})
- Cylinders: Four
- High-pressure cylinder: 18 in (457 mm) bore 26 in (660 mm) stroke
- Low-pressure cylinder: 28 1/2 in (724 mm) bore 26 in (660 mm) stroke
- Valve gear: Walschaerts
- Valve type: HP Piston; LP Slide
- Couplers: Johnston link-and-pin
Performance figures
- Tractive effort: 45,900 lbf (204 kN) @ 50%
Career
- Operators: Central South African Railways; South African Railways
- Class: Class MF
- Number in class: 14
- Numbers: CSAR 1015-1023; SAR 1619-1627, 1629-1633
- Delivered: 1911
- First run: 1911
- Withdrawn: 1939

The South African Railways Class MF 2-6-6-2 of 1911 was a steam locomotive from the pre-Union era in Transvaal.

In 1911, the Central South African Railways placed nine Mallet articulated compound steam locomotives with a 2-6-6-2 wheel arrangement in service. In 1912, when they were assimilated into the South African Railways, they were renumbered and designated Class MF. Five more of these locomotives were delivered in November 1911 and were numbered directly onto the South African Railways roster.

== Manufacturer ==
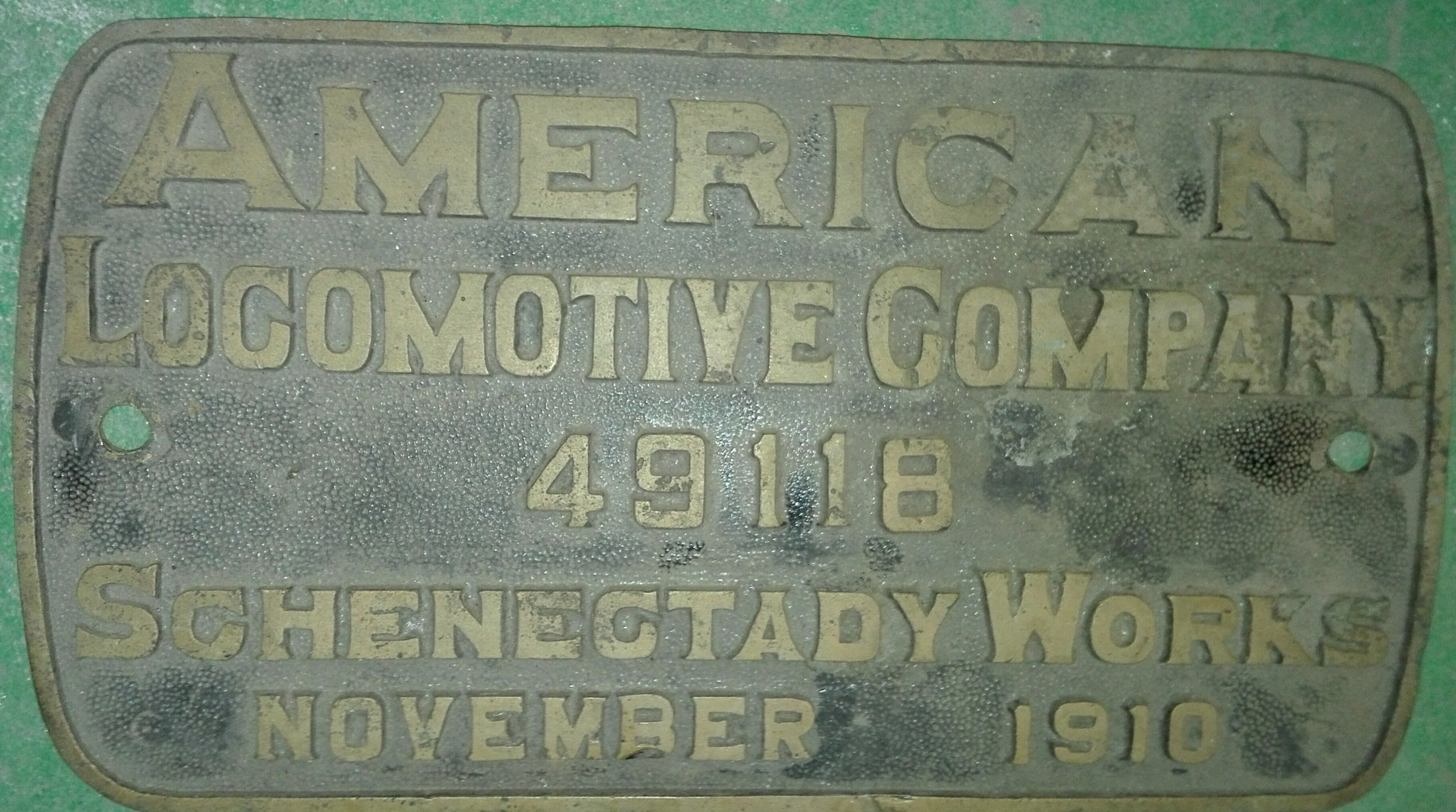
Mallet builder's plate

Nine Mallet articulated compound steam locomotives which were delivered to the Central South African Railways (CSAR) in 1911 were built by the American Locomotive Company (ALCO) in 1910 and 1911. They were erected at the Durban workshops in March 1911 and were very similar to the experimental Class MD which had been delivered in 1910, except that the new locomotives were equipped with Schmidt superheaters. These engines had Walschaerts valve gear and Type XS tenders with a coal capacity of 10 long tons (10.2 tonnes) and a water capacity of 5,000 imperial gallons (22,700 litres). They were numbered in the range from 1015 to 1023.

== Compound expansion ==
In a compound locomotive, steam is expanded in phases. After being expanded in a high-pressure cylinder and having then lost pressure and given up part of its heat, it is exhausted into a larger-volume low-pressure cylinder for secondary expansion, after which it is exhausted through the smokebox. By comparison, in the more usual arrangement of simple expansion (simplex), steam is expanded just once in any one cylinder before being exhausted through the smokebox.

In the compound Mallet locomotive, the rear set of coupled wheels are driven by the smaller high-pressure cylinders which are fed steam from the steam dome via the superheater. Their spent steam is then fed to the larger low-pressure cylinders which drive the front set of coupled wheels.

== Characteristics ==
The most noticeable external difference from the experimental Class MD engine was the altered arrangement of the main steam pipes necessitated by the superheater. Instead of being led vertically down from the dome directly to the high-pressure cylinders, an internal pipe was taken from the regulator valve in the dome to the superheater in the smokebox, from where it was brought back to the high-pressure cylinders by external steam pipes arranged under the running boards.

== South African Railways ==
When the Union of South Africa was established on 31 May 1910, the three Colonial government railways (Cape Government Railways, Natal Government Railways and CSAR) were united under a single administration to control and administer the railways, ports and harbours of the Union. Although the South African Railways and Harbours came into existence in 1910, with Sir William Hoy appointed as its first General Manager, the actual classification and renumbering of all the rolling stock of the three constituent railways were only implemented with effect from 1 January 1912.

In 1912, these locomotives were renumbered in the range from 1619 to 1627 and designated Class MF on the South African Railways (SAR). Five more of the type had been delivered from ALCO in November 1911, but these were numbered directly onto the SAR roster in the range from 1629 to 1633, marking the introduction of the SAR renumbering scheme under the Union programme. These locomotives were delivered with smaller Type XM4 tenders which had the same coal capacity as the Type XS tenders of the first nine engines, but a smaller water capacity of 4,000 imperial gallons (18,200 litres).

The new locomotives were erected in the workshops in Pretoria rather than Durban. The erection of engines away from ports was an innovation which was probably the outcome of experience gained with the Class MD, which had been erected at Durban. While the locomotive was brought to the Transvaal, difficulty was experienced at Drummond and Laing's Nek where the drain angles on the cab roof struck the sides of the tunnels.

== Service ==
The Class MF joined the experimental Class MD on the coal traffic line between Witbank and Germiston. They were acquired to improve the traffic flow on this line with its ruling gradient of one in one hundred (1%), where the increase of traffic and the resultant congestion was causing considerable delays en route which led to excessive hours of duty being imposed on crews. When the Mallets replaced the existing Class 11 locomotives on this line, train loads could be increased from 900 long tons (914 tonnes) to 1,600 long tons (1,626 tonnes).

The Mallets proved to be capable of handling the heavy coal loads. In May 1914, Class MF no. 1620 was used in a test run from Witbank to Germiston, hauling 55 bogie wagons with an all-up weight of 1,626 long tons (1,652 tonnes). The 80 miles (129 kilometres) journey was accomplished in seven hours, which included several stops.

== Modification to simplex ==
In 1923, engine no. 1620 was converted to a simple expansion locomotive in the Salvokop shops in Pretoria by replacing the two slide-valved low-pressure cylinders with piston-valved high-pressure cylinders. Five more, numbers 1621 to 1623, 1631 and 1632, were also converted to simple expansion locomotives in 1925. Three of these, numbers 1620, 1631 and 1632, were then transferred to East London where more powerful locomotives were needed since the mainline had a heavy gradient of one in forty (2½%) which started right at the end of the East London departing platform, making it an extremely difficult section. They appear to have not been up to the task in the Eastern Cape, however, since by 1926 they were observed there staged out of service.

They were all withdrawn from service and scrapped by 1939.

== Illustration ==
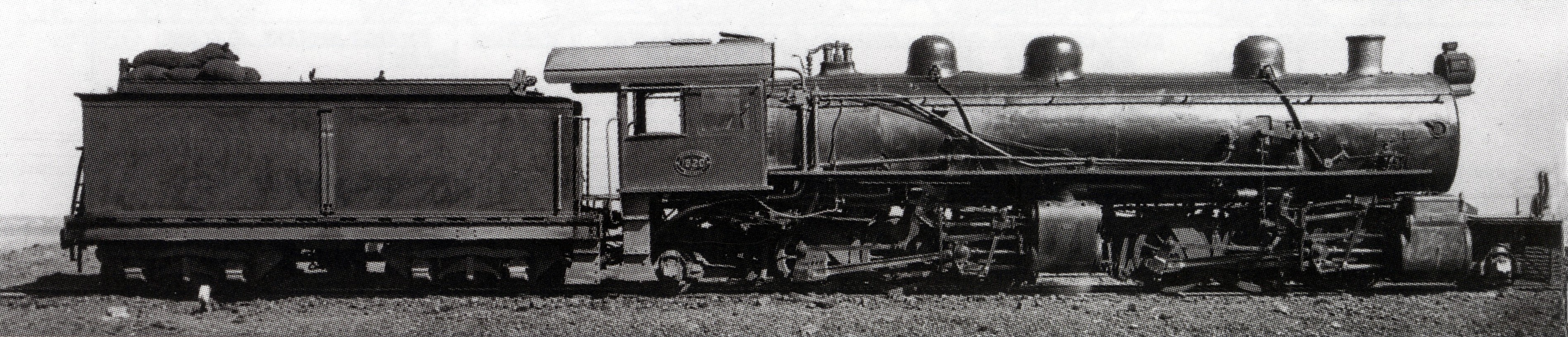
SAR no. 1620, ex CSAR no. 1016 as compound engine, c. 1920

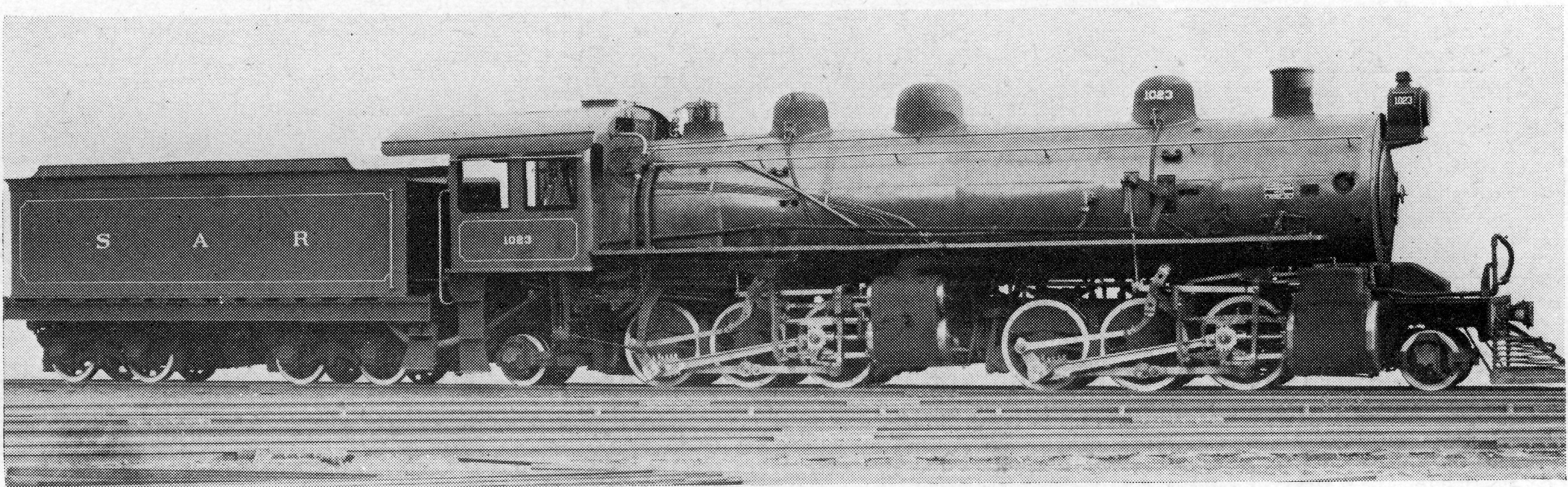
Builder's photo of SAR no. 1627, ex CSAR no. 1023 as compound engine, c. 1912

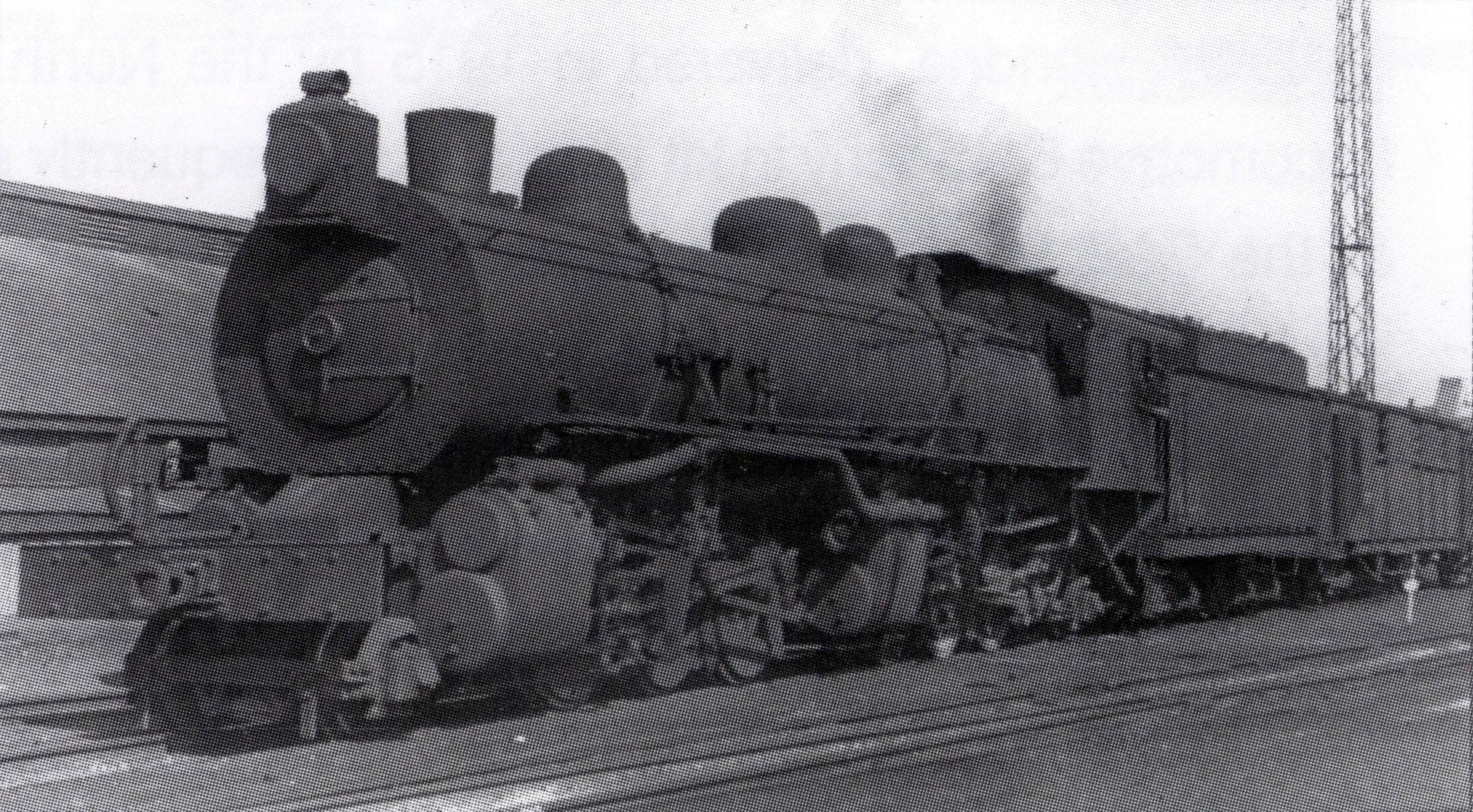
SAR no. 1623 as simple expansion engine, c. 1930
