= 4-6-6-2 =

Articulated locomotive wheel arrangement

In Whyte notation, a 4-6-6-2 is a steam locomotive with four leading wheels (two axles) in an unpowered bogie at the front of the locomotive followed by two sets of driving wheels with six wheels each (three axles each), followed by two unpowered trailing wheels (one axle) at the rear of the locomotive.

Other equivalent classifications are:
UIC classification: 2CC1 (also known as German classification and Italian classification)
French classification: 230+031
Turkish classification: 35+34
Swiss classification: 3/5+3/4

This wheel arrangement was used only as a very limited number of locomotives in North America, most notably as class MM-2 oil-fired cab forward locomotives on the Southern Pacific Railroad. These were effectively 2-6-6-4s running in reverse. They were originally built as 2-6-6-2s but were refitted with a four-wheel leading truck to increase stability at speed. Southern Pacific AM-2s were built from July to August 1911 by Baldwin Locomotive Works as Cab Forwards. These 4-6-6-2s began retirement in the mid- to late-1930s, although a few remained in operation until the end of World War II. No locomotives of this configuration were preserved.
