= 2-6-6-2 =

Articulated locomotive wheel arrangement

Equivalent classifications
- UIC class: (1C)C1, (1'C)C1'
- French class: 130+031
- Turkish class: 34+34
- Swiss class: 3/4+3/4
- Russian class: 1-3-0+0-3-1
First known tender engine version
- First use: 1906
- Country: United States
- Locomotive: Class L-1 2-6-6-2
- Railway: Great Northern Railway
- Designer: Baldwin Locomotive Works
- Builder: Baldwin Locomotive Works
- Evolved from: 0-6-6-0, 2-6-6-0
- Evolved to: 2-6-8-0, 2-8-8-2
- Benefits: Able to follow tighter curve than contemporary 2-10-2 locomotives of similar tractive effort
- Drawbacks: Higher maintenance costs due to a second set of cylinders and valve gear

Under the Whyte notation for the classification of steam locomotives by wheel arrangement, a 2-6-6-2 is a locomotive with one pair of unpowered leading wheels, followed by two sets of three pairs of powered driving wheels and one pair of trailing wheels. The wheel arrangement was principally used on Mallet-type articulated locomotives, although some tank locomotive examples were also built. A Garratt locomotive or Golwé locomotive with the same wheel arrangement is designated 2-6-0+0-6-2 since both engine units are pivoting.

Under the UIC classification the wheel arrangement is referred to as (1'C)C1' for Mallet locomotives.

== Overview ==
The first locomotives of the 2-6-6-2 wheel arrangement were built in 1906 by the Great Northern Railway to permit longer trains on their heavily graded line over the Cascade Mountains. They were a refinement of the first North American Mallets, 0-6-6-0 engines built for the Baltimore & Ohio in 1904, with leading and trailing trucks to allow higher speeds in road service or as a "light engine" returning from helper duty. In North America the 2-6-6-2 wheel arrangement was most often used for articulated compound steam Mallet locomotives. In a compound Mallet, the rear set of coupled wheels are driven by the smaller high pressure cylinders, from which spent steam is then fed to the larger low pressure cylinders that drive the front set of coupled wheels. Compound engines of this type continued to be built until 1923, with a repeat order for 10 engines by the Chesapeake and Ohio Railway in 1949. Two non-compound engines were built for the Baltimore & Ohio in 1930, and both standard and narrow gauge engines for the National Railways of Mexico in the 1930s.

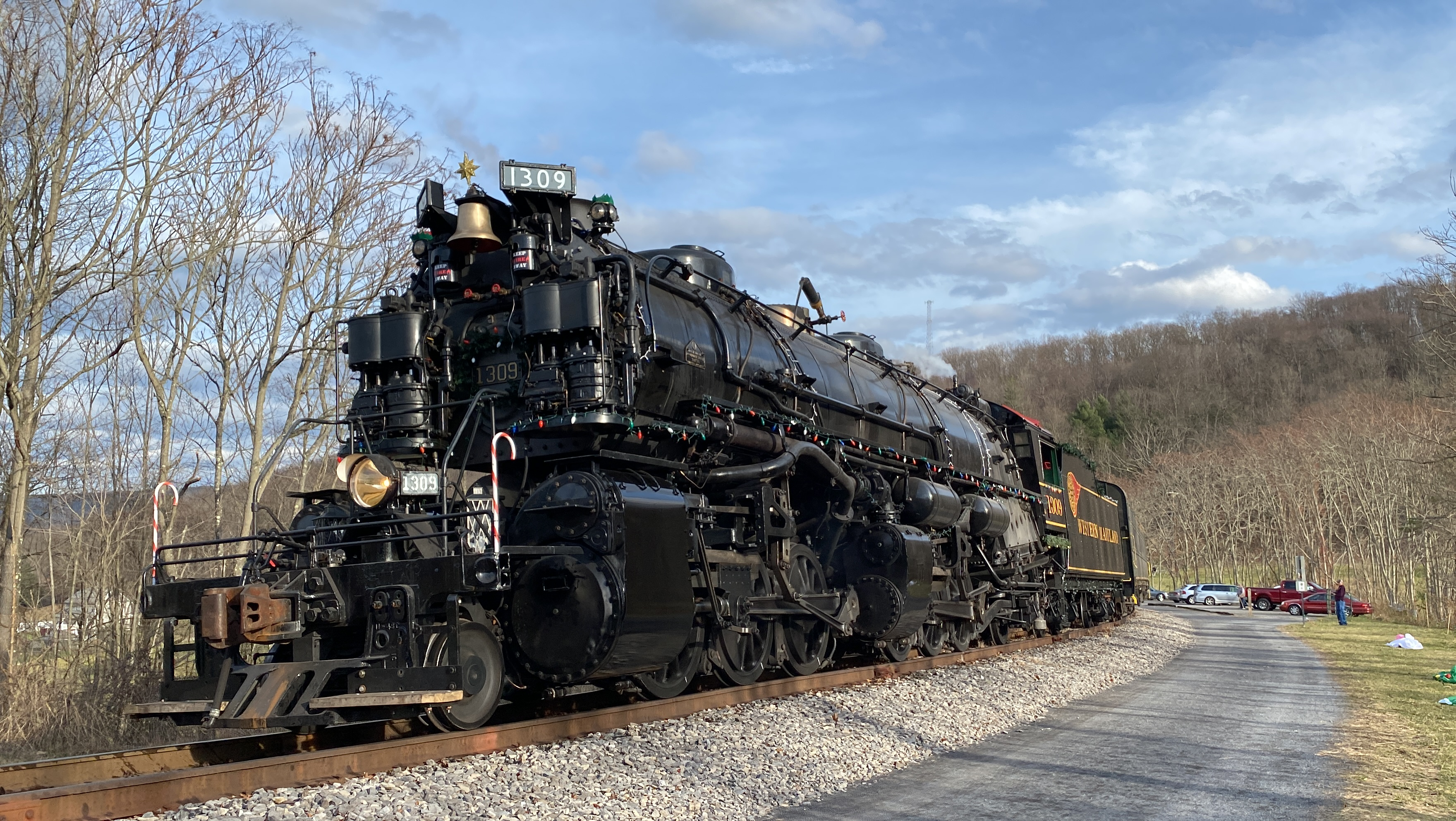
One of the 1949 engines, Chesapeake and Ohio 2-6-6-2 No. 1309 on the Western Maryland Scenic Railroad.

Chesapeake and Ohio 1309 is now operating on Western Maryland Scenic Railroad after a restoration completed in December 2020. It operated on its first excursion in December 2021.

North American builders also produced such engines for service on logging railroads, and for export to Santo Domingo, Serbia, India, and South Africa. Additional examples were built by North British Locomotive Works for South Africa, and a single experimental engine by the Soviet Union.

== North American Usage ==
=== United States: standard gauge except as noted ===
The Locomotive Dictionary edition of 1916 illustrates engines built by Baldwin for the Atchison, Topeka and Santa Fe and by the American Locomotive Company for the Chicago, Milwaukee and Puget Sound Railway.

In the 1922 edition the type is shown only in the category "Foreign and Industrial Locomotives". "Super Power" steam locomotives with feedwater heaters and four wheel trailing trucks were introduced in 1925, allowing greater firebox area and higher horsepower. The 2-6-6-2 wheel arrangement was essentially outmoded for mainline engines built after that time.

==== Early engines by Burnham, Williams & Co. / Baldwin ====
The first American locomotives of this wheel arrangement were five engines built in 1906 for the Great Northern Railway (U.S.) by Burnham, Williams & Co., a predecessor of Baldwin Locomotive Works, as class L-1. Baldwin 2-6-6-2's of the 1906-1910 period fall into three basic design groups, with a handful of single orders in the 1910-1912 period. The Baldwin engines built in this period used saturated steam, as the superheater had not come into general use. With two exceptions noted below, driving wheels were 55 to 57 in (1,400 to 1,400 mm) in diameter. The trailing wheels were for guidance rather than to permit use of a larger firebox as was the case in later engines.

===== Hill Road "large" engines =====
21-1/2" by 32" HP cylinders, 33" x 32" LP cylinders, 78 sq. ft. grate area.

The initial group of five GN class L-1 engines were initially assigned to helper service in the Cascade Mountains. Twenty more class L-1s were built in 1907–08, three of which were diverted to the Chicago, Burlington and Quincy Railroad. These engines conformed to Great Northern preference for boilers with Belpaire fireboxes. Five more were built for the CB&Q in 1908. The CB&Q converted both groups to 0-8-0 switch engines in 1926–27. The Northern Pacific Railroad acquired 16 similar engines in 1907.

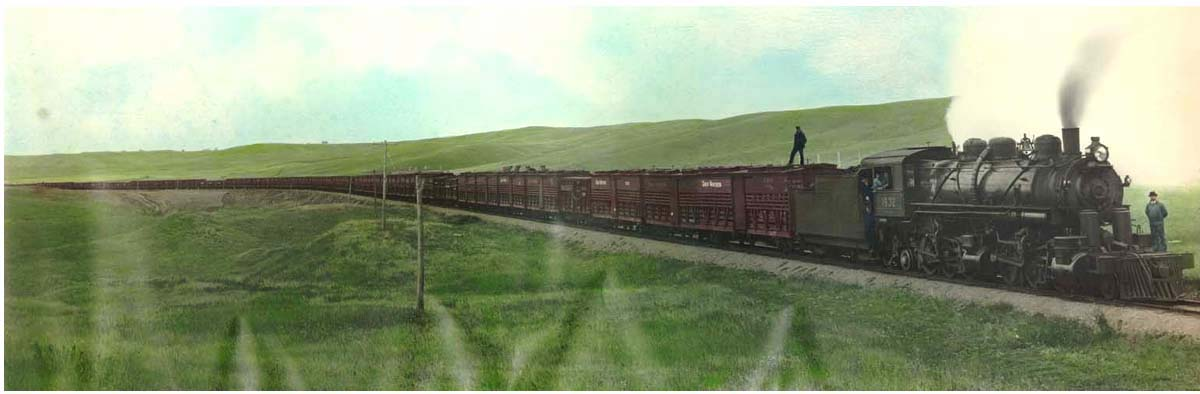
A Great Northern 2-6-6-2 pulling a stock train in North Dakota

===== Hill Road "small" engines =====
20" by 30" HP cylinders, 31" x 30" LP cylinders, 53.4 sq. ft. grate area.

In addition to the class L-1s, Great Northern purchased 45 lighter engines, class L-2, in 1907–08. The Northern Pacific Railroad acquired 6 engines, again similar to the Great Northern engines, in 1910.

===== Other Baldwin engines, 1909 to 1911 =====
23" x 32" HP cylinders, 32" x 32" LP cylinders

The Clinchfield Railroad purchased a single 2-6-6-2 from Baldwin in 1909, which was scrapped in 1938.

The Western Maryland Railroad acquired nine 2-6-6-2 engines in 1909-11 for pusher service. In 1931 their leading and trailing trucks were removed, resulting in an 0-6-6-0 wheel arrangement, and they were used in yard service. The last was retired in 1951.

The Chicago Great Western Railroad purchased ten 2-6-6-2 engines from Baldwin in 1910, which they sold to the Clinchfield Railroad in 1916. The Clinchfield scrapped them in 1925.

===== Miscellaneous =====
The Clinchfield purchased ten larger engines in 1910: 24 in × 32 in (610 mm × 810 mm) high pressure and 37 in × 32 in (940 mm × 810 mm) low pressure cylinders. The latter were rebuilt in 1923, notably including superheaters, and continued to operate until 1952.

The Galveston, Harrisburg & San Antonio Railroad, part of the Texas and New Orleans Railroad, a subsidiary of the Southern Pacific Railroad, purchased twelve engines with 21.5 in × 30 in (550 mm × 760 mm) high pressure and 33 in × 30 in (840 mm × 760 mm) low pressure cylinders in 1910, which they dubbed "Mogul Mallets". They were retired in 1929–30.

Five engines built in 1912 for the Missouri, Oklahoma & Gulf Railroad, later Kansas, Oklahoma and Gulf Railway were slightly smaller.

The most unusual engines of this wheel arrangement were the twelve cab-forward examples built for the Southern Pacific Railroad, class MM-2, in 1912. Like all cab-forward engines they were oil fired; they had 63 in (1,600 mm) drive wheels, 25 in × 28 in (640 mm × 710 mm) high pressure and 38 in × 28 in (970 mm × 710 mm) low pressure cylinders. They were intended for passenger service but proved unstable at speed. One derailed while pulling the Overland Limited at Applegate, California in 1912, and they were soon converted to 4-6-6-2 by replacing the front truck with a four-wheel design, and re-designated class AM-2.

A ca-1915 catalog of the Baldwin Locomotive Works lists nine sizes of standard gauge 2-6-6-2 locomotives, along with four sizes available in either 3 ft (914 mm) or 1,000 mm (3 ft 3 3/8 in) gauge.

Table 1. Baldwin Locomotive Works Standard 2-6-6-2 Engines
Gauge	Code Word	HP Cyl Dia	LP Cyl Dia	Stroke	Drivers	Boiler Pressure	Tractive Effort	Weight on Drivers	Total Weight	Driver Wheel Base	Total Wheelbase
Std	Maximilian	13	20	20	37	200	21,900	105,000	124,000	20' 6"	32' 6"
Std	Maximist	15	23	22	40	200	29,700	134,000	156,000	22' 4"	35' 9"
Std	Maximize	17	26	24	44	200	37,900	168,000	192,000	24' 10"	39' 0"
Std	Maximizing	18	28	26	48	200	42,200	192,000	220,000	26' 6"	40' 10"
Std	Maximophere	20	31	28	51	200	52,800	240,000	278,000	27' 8"	42' 10"
Std	Maximorum	21	32	30	55	210	60,800	278,000	316,000	28' 11"	43' 9"
Std	Maximum	21.5	33	32	55	200	64,800	296,000	336,000	29' 8"	45' 4"
Std	Maxyer	23	35	32	55	200	74,000	314,000	360,000	29' 8"	45' 4"
Std	Mayada	24	37	32	57	200	77,500	334,000	384,000	30' 4"	46' 4"
3' / 1 m	Maxilliped	12.5	19	20	37	200	20,200	94,000	116,000	20' 6"	32' 10"
3' / 1 m	Maxillis	14.5	22	20	37	200	27,300	112,000	136,000	20' 11	33' 7"
3' / 1 m	Maxima	15.5	24	20	37	200	31,200	132,000	154,000	23' 3"	35' 9"
1 m	Maximiano	17	26	22	45	200	34,000	162,000	191,000	28' 9"	42' 9"

Measurements are given in English measure as in the original catalog. The 210 psi (1,400 kPa) boiler pressure on line 6, "Maximorum", is doubtful. The two largest narrow gauge engines are outside frame designs.

The "code words" are an example of a commercial code commonly used in telegrams between the home office of an organization and its branches or clients to minimize communication costs and reduce the chance of errors.

==== Engines with jointed boilers ====
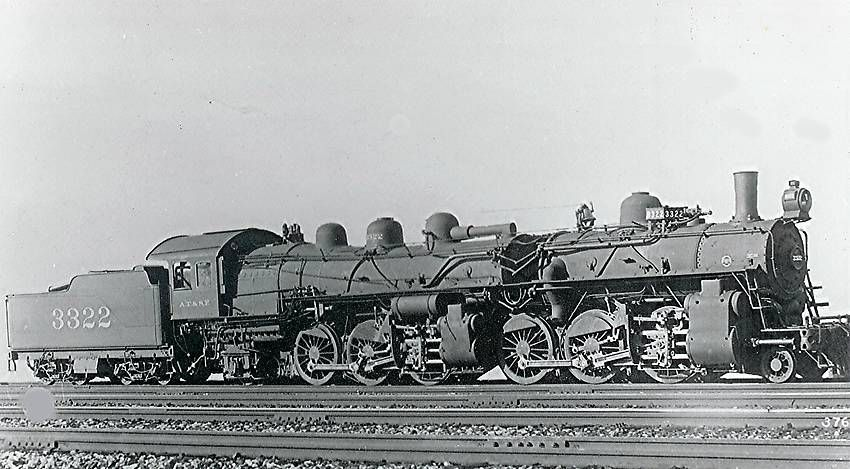
ATSF 2-6-6-2 engine 3322

In 1910 the Atchison, Topeka and Santa Fe Railroad built its first 2-6-6-2, number 1157, from a pair of 2-6-2 Prairie engines in its shops in Topeka, Kansas. Two more, numbers 1158 and 1159, were built by Baldwin. These three had two boiler sections connected by joints. Thirty eight additional engines built by Baldwin had rigid boilers.

Ten additional 2-6-6-2 engines were built by Baldwin for the Chicago, Burlington and Quincy Railroad in 1910. They had a rigid two-section boiler with a feedwater heater occupying the front half, and were designed to burn low quality lignite coal. Unlike previous engines they had 64 in (1.63 m) driving wheels. They primarily worked in the Black Hills.

==== 1910 to 1917 engines, primarily Alco ====
American Locomotive Company produced groups of 2-6-6-2 locomotives for several railroads in the period from 1910 to 1917. Commonly each railroad would buy a small lot; satisfied customers would order more, typically with improvements to meet their specific requirements. After 1911 superheaters were generally employed to improve efficiency. Alco built these locomotives at its Schenectady and Brooks plants in New York state, and at Richmond, Virginia. Four roads furnished the majority of the orders.

===== Boston & Albany and New York Central =====
A subsidiary of the New York Central Railroad, the Boston and Albany Railroad acquired one 2-6-6-2 type, numbered 1249, from the Schenectady Works of Alco in 1910. It was subsequently transferred to the NYC and renumbered 1375.

Similar, but slightly heavier engines 1300 to 1312 were built between 1912 and 1917. These and subsequent engines were equipped with stokers. All were retired between 1930 and 1932. They were primarily used to haul freight trains out of the Connecticut River Valley in both directions from Springfield, Massachusetts.

In 1912 the New York Central Railroad also purchased 25 similar engines, numbers 1375 to 1399. They purchased additional engines 1349 to 1373 in 1917 and engines 1339 to 1348 in 1920–21. These engines initially had a similar role to the B&A engines hauling freight trains up West Albany Hill out of the Hudson River valley. After completion of the Alfred H. Smith Memorial Bridge in 1924, traffic from New England no longer descended into the valley and fewer such engines were needed at Albany. Some were reassigned to branch lines in Pennsylvania and southeastern Ohio and used to pull trains of coal. Forty-four of these engines were also scrapped between 1932 and 1934; the remaining 16 were renumbered 1933 to 1948 in 1936 and remained in service until after the end of World War II. The last were retired in November, 1952.

All of the 1300 series engines of both roads had a total weight in working order of 363,800 pounds (approximately 165 tonnes) and a coupled length of 85 feet, 7 1/4 inches (26.09 meters).

The NYC engines built before 1920 had oil headlamps mounted on the front frame of the locomotive, rather than the traditional location on the front surface of the boiler. In 1920 the Interstate Commerce Commission required that road locomotives be fitted with electric headlights and both Pyle-National and Sunbeam units were fitted, in some cases on the front of the boiler.

===== Buffalo, Rochester and Pittsburgh =====
The Buffalo, Rochester and Pittsburgh Railroad purchased 55 locomotives, numbers 700 to 754, between 1914 and 1923. When this railroad was merged into the Baltimore and Ohio Railroad in 1932, they were kept and renumbered 7700 to 7754.

===== Chesapeake and Ohio =====
The Chesapeake and Ohio Railway ordered its first 2-6-6-2 engine in 1910, from the Schenectady plant of Alco, and a second was purchased used from the Chicago and Alton Railroad. Repeated orders through 1923, and a final order in 1949, brought a total of 250 engines to the roster. Twenty of these were USRA engines, discussed below. In addition, 25 engines built for the Hocking Valley Railroad in 1917 were acquired through merger in 1930.

C&O engines 1300 to 1309, built in 1949, were the first significant group built to this wheel arrangement for U.S. use in 25 years. They were also the last steam locomotives built by Baldwin for a U.S. railroad.

===== Norfolk and Western =====
In 1912 the Norfolk and Western Railway purchased 15 copies of the Chesapeake and Ohio engine from the Richmond plant of Alco, which they designated as Class Z. 175 improved engines, Class Z-1, were purchased between 1912 and 1918. They lasted nearly to the end of N&W steam operations, in 1958. Two were sold to Denver & Rio Grand Western in 1943, becoming their Class L-76.

===== Others =====
The Chicago and Alton Railroad purchased three 2-6-6-2 engines from the Brooks plant of Alco, also in 1910, one of which was almost immediately sold to the Chesapeake and Ohio Railway. They were used in helper and coal service until the railroad came under the control of the Baltimore and Ohio Railroad in 1931, when they were stored and subsequently scrapped.

Denver and Rio Grande purchased eight 2-6-6-2 engines, Class 340/L-62, built by the Schenectady plant of Alco, in 1910. They were purchased for helper service on Soldier Summit and Tennessee Pass. During the 1940s it also purchased two N&W locomotives, designated Class L-76, also for helper service. All were retired between 1947 and 1952.

The Milwaukee Road purchased 25 compound 2-6-6-2 engines of Class N-1 in 1910-11 from Alco, and sixteen more, Class N-2, in 1916. Initially eight were oil fueled, and some additional engines were converted to burn oil when they were displaced from the steepest mainline grades by electrification.

The Western Pacific Railroad's M-80 class consisted of five oil fueled 2-6-6-2 engines built by Alco in 1917 and five more built in 1924. Initially they were used in the Feather River Canyon between Oroville and Portola, California, and after 1931 on the Northern California Extension from Keddie to Bieber, California. They served until 1953.

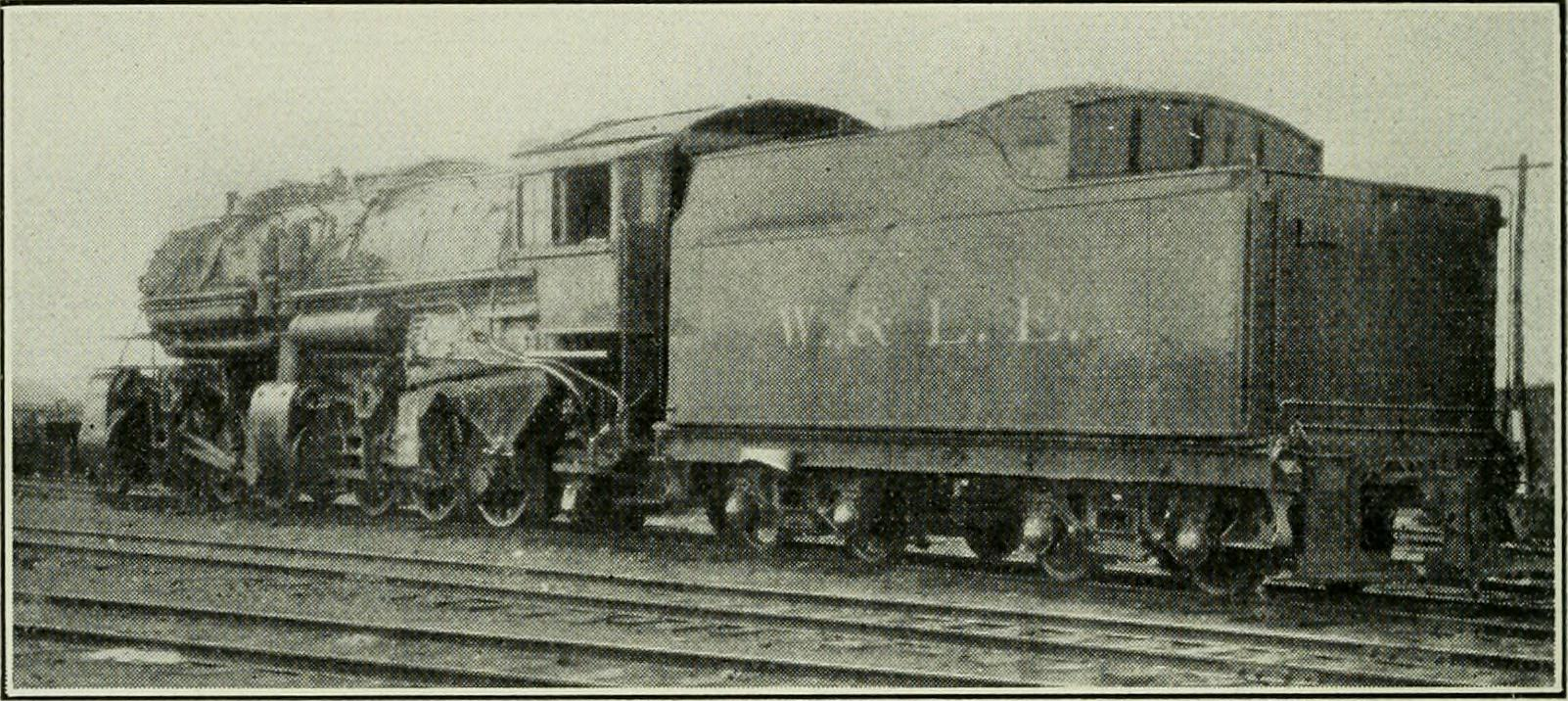
Wheeling & Lake Erie 2-6-6-2 locomotive

The Wheeling and Lake Erie Railway purchased 20 2-6-6-2 locomotives in 1917, notable for having 63" driving wheels rather than the 57" size common on most engines of the period. This enabled them to attain somewhat faster speeds in mainline service.

==== USRA 2-6-6-2 "light Mallets" ====
The Chesapeake and Ohio Railway received 20 2-6-6-2 engines built to a standardized design of the United States Railroad Administration while the railroads were under federal control in 1918–20. That railroad's management resisted taking them, as they felt their own design was superior for mine runs and the USRA engines were designed for main line operation, for which they preferred a more powerful 2-8-8-2. However the USRA 2-8-8-2 engine's front (low pressure) cylinders were too wide for existing tunnels on the C&O main line, notably the mile long Big Bend Tunnel.

The Wheeling and Lake Erie Railway was allocated 10 2-6-6-2 locomotives by the USRA. Unlike the C&O engines, they were built by Baldwin. Following a merger in 1932 they became the property of the Nickel Plate Road.

In a survey published at the end of government control, both the C&O and the W&LE compared the USRA engines unfavorably to engines of the same wheel arrangement they had received between 1910 and 1917 . Unlike other USRA wheel arrangements, no copies were built after the railroads were returned to their owners.

==== 1919 to 1924 ====
Between 1919 and 1924 the Chesapeake & Ohio, the New York Central, and the Western Pacific purchased additional locomotives of their preferred designs. The Central of Georgia purchased ten engines from the Richmond Works in 1919, but sold them to the Illinois Central Railroad, which controlled them, a few years later.

The Verde Tunnel & Smelter Company purchased two coal fueled engines from the Schenectady works in 1920 and operated them between Jerome and Clarksdale, Arizona. During World War II they were sold to the Southern Pacific Railroad, converted to burn oil, and placed in class MM-3. They were used in helper and branch line service on the Los Angeles Division until 1951 and 1954 Southern Pacific Engine No. 3930 in the mid-forties.

==== Experimental ====
The Baltimore and Ohio Railroad purchased two experimental engines in 1930. Both were simple articulated engines, one with a conventional boiler and the other with a water tube boiler.

==== Logging and mining locomotives ====
Baldwin added Mallet locomotives to their catalog before World War I, both in standard gauge and narrow gauge, and in both tank and tender versions. They continued to produce small lots for logging railroads in the Western US until the 1930s. These were generally standard gauge 2-6-6-2 tank engines, either being saddle tanks or pannier tanks.

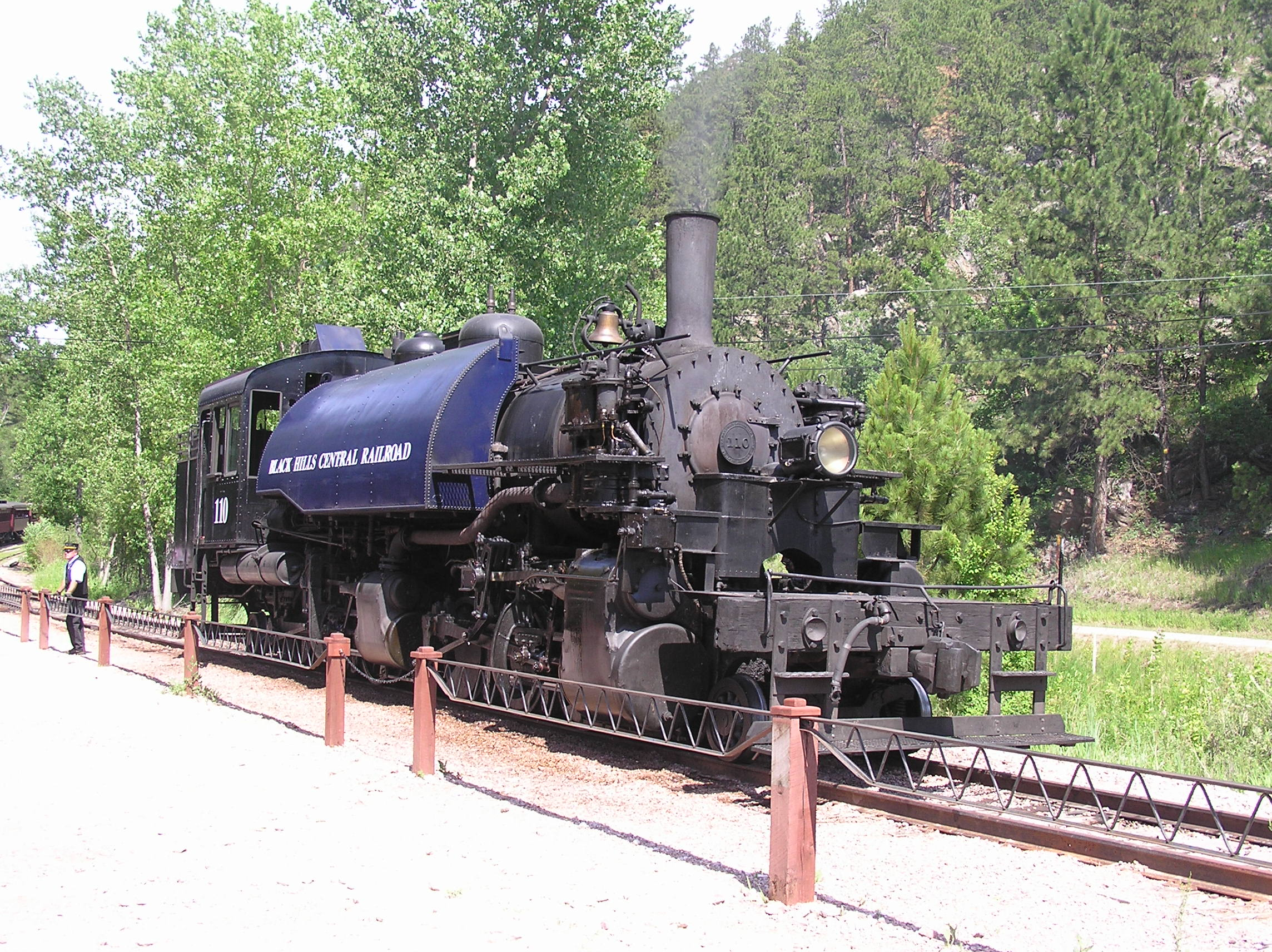
Black Hills Central 2-6-6-2PT locomotive

At least three of these locomotives are preserved.

The Black Hills Central Railroad operates a 2-6-6-2T engine built for Potlatch Lumber Company in 1926, later acquired by Weyerhaeuser Company and renumbered 108. It also operates Weyerhaeuser engine 110.

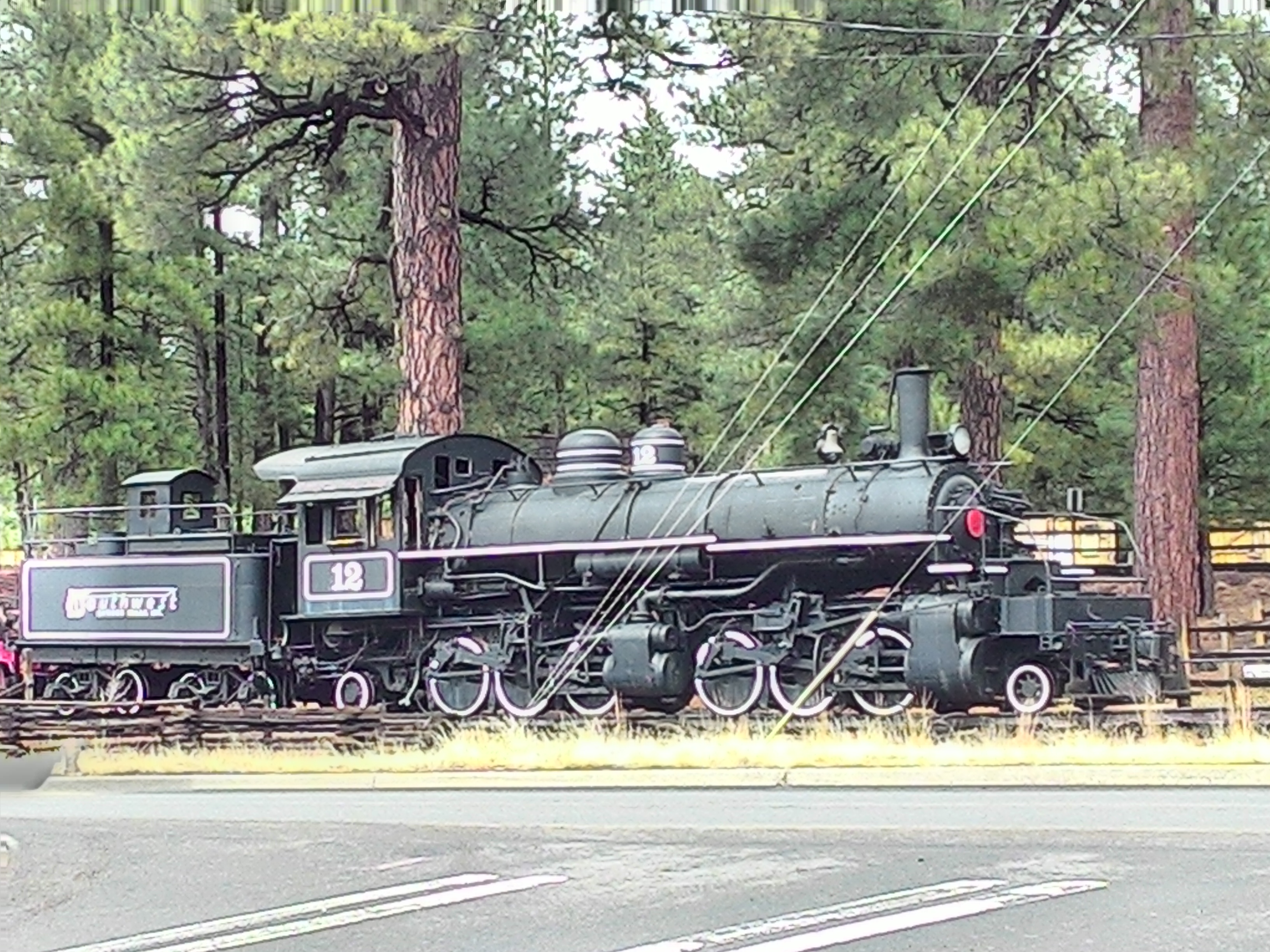
Southwest Forest Industries 2-6-6-2 locomotive in Flagstaff AZ

Southwest Forest Industries number 12, previously Hammond Lumber Company number 6, was one of a pair of logging locomotives built by Baldwin in 1929. It is displayed in Flagstaff, Arizona.

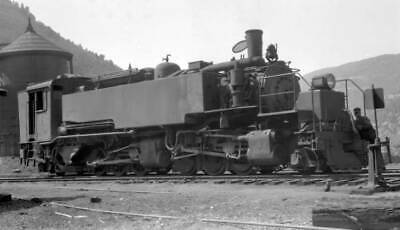
Uintah Railway narrow gauge 2-6-6-2T locomotive

Uintah Railway engines 50 and 51, having track gauge of 36 inches, were built by Baldwin in 1926 and 1928 respectively. These engines were simple articulated locomotives rather than compound Mallet locomotives, and they were 2-6-6-2T tank engines carrying coal behind the cab and water on side tanks. They were sold to the Sumpter Valley Railway in 1940 and then to the International Railways of Central America in 1947 and operated in Guatemala.

=== Locomotives built for export ===
Baldwin produced a variety of 2-6-6-2 locomotives for export, including an engine of 2 ft 6 in (762 mm) gauge for the Ingenio Angelina in Santo Domingo in 1908, Mexico in 1908 and 1911 (see below), tank engines for the Ferrocarril del Sur of Columbia in 1921, and tender engines for the Northwestern Railway of India in 1923.

ALCo locomotives exported to Mexico, Serbia and South Africa are discussed under the headings for those countries below.

=== Mexico: standard and narrow gauge ===
An engine of similar cylinder dimensions to the Hill Road "large" engines, but smaller grate area, was built for the Central Mexicano in 1908, and 20 more for the successor, National Railways of Mexico, in 1910. In 1925 they also acquired through merger two small examples built in 1910 by Schenectady for the Nor-Oeste de Mexico.

NdeM purchased 10 simple (non-compound) 3 ft (914 mm) 2-6-6-2 engines between 1928 and 1936, and 8 standard gauge, simple engines in 1937, all from ALCo's Schenectady Works.

== African and European Usage ==
=== South Africa: Cape Gauge (3 ft 6 in) ===
The South African Railways (SAR) operated 22 Mallet locomotives with this wheel arrangement, spread over five classes, all of them built to 3 ft 6 in (1,067 mm) Cape gauge.

- In March 1910, the Central South African Railways (CSAR) placed a single experimental Mallet articulated compound steam locomotive in service.
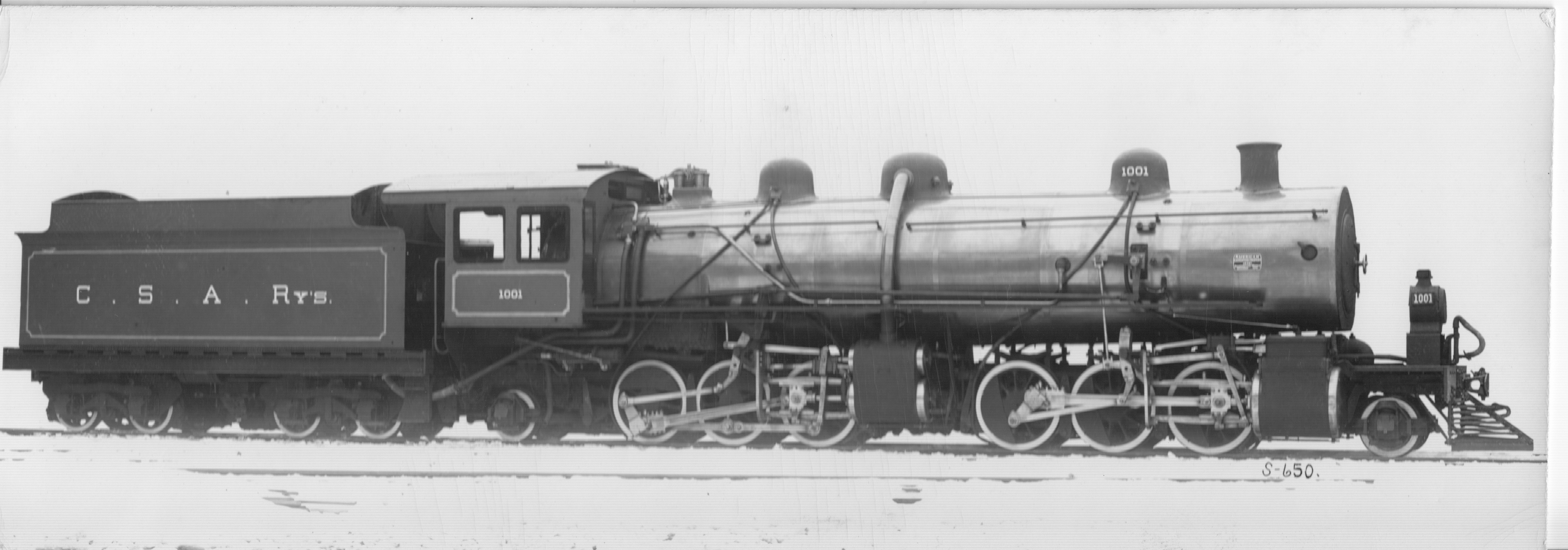
  CSAR experimental Mallet, SAR Class MD
  Ordered from ALCO, it was the first Mallet on the CSAR and, with its full working order weight of 157 long tons (159.5 tonnes; 175.8 short tons), it was the heaviest locomotive in the world working on 3 ft 6 in gauge at the time. It had Walschaerts valve gear and used saturated steam. In 1912, when it was assimilated into the SAR, it was designated Class MD.

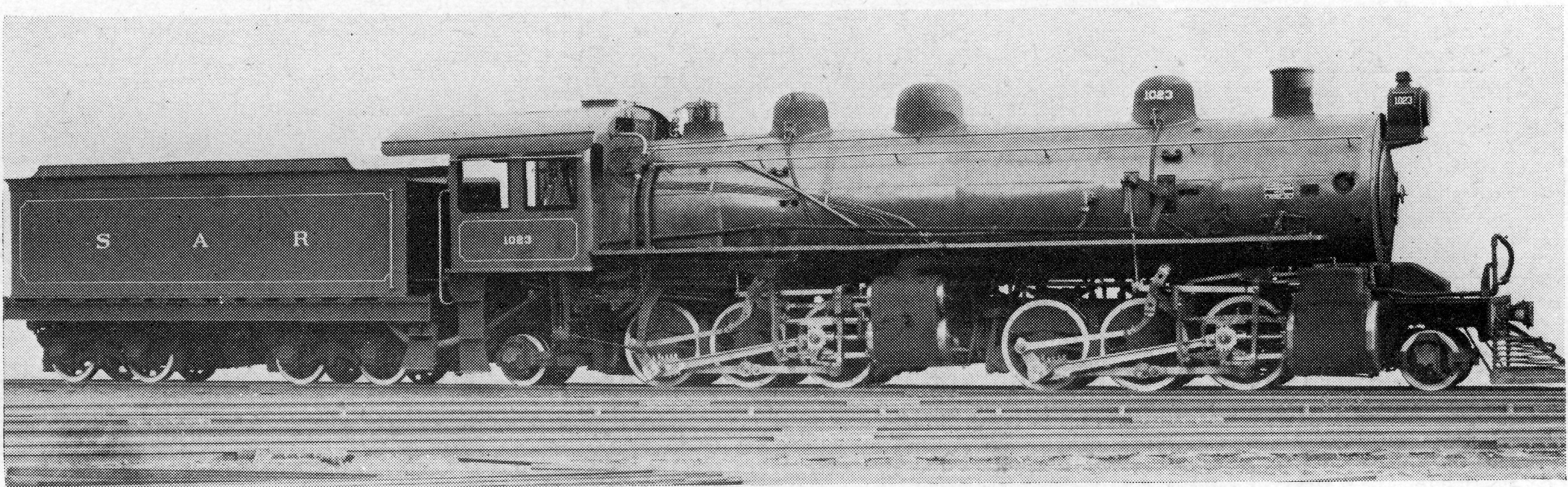
CSAR no. 1023, SAR Class MF

- In 1911, the CSAR placed nine compound Mallets in service. Also built by ALCO and with Walschaerts valve gear, they were very similar to the experimental Class MD, but they were equipped with Schmidt superheaters. In 1912, when they were assimilated into the SAR, they were classified as Class MF. Five more that were delivered in November 1911 were taken directly onto the SAR roster. In 1923 and 1925, six of them were converted to simple expansion (simplex) locomotives.

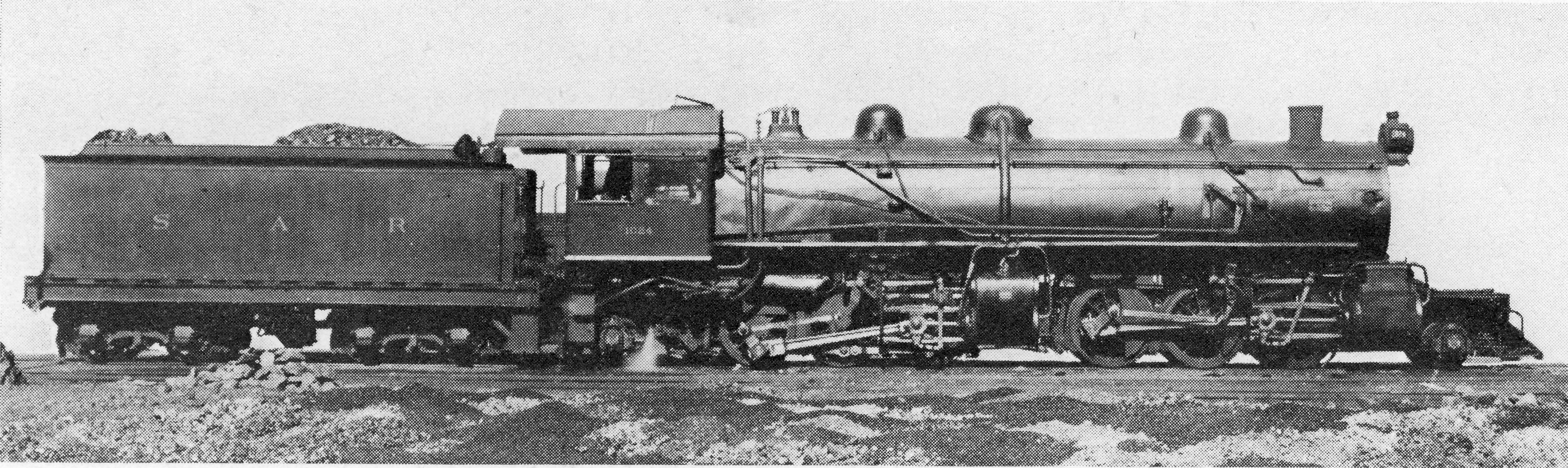
SAR Class MG

- A single experimental compound locomotive was included with the CSAR's order for Class MF Mallets from ALCO. It was similar to the others, also with Walschaerts valve gear, but it used saturated steam and had a mechanical stoker, the first South African locomotive to be so equipped. The coupled wheels on the leading engine unit were of a 5 inches (127 millimetres) larger diameter than those of the trailing engine unit. It was the only South African articulated locomotive to have driving wheels of different diameters and, in theory, this configuration was to result in improved acceleration, with the rear engine unit providing the traction. It was also believed that the difference in frequency between the front and rear cylinder exhaust beats would result in a more even pressure in the receiver pipe and therefore improved steam flow. In 1912, when it was assimilated into the SAR, it was designated Class MG.

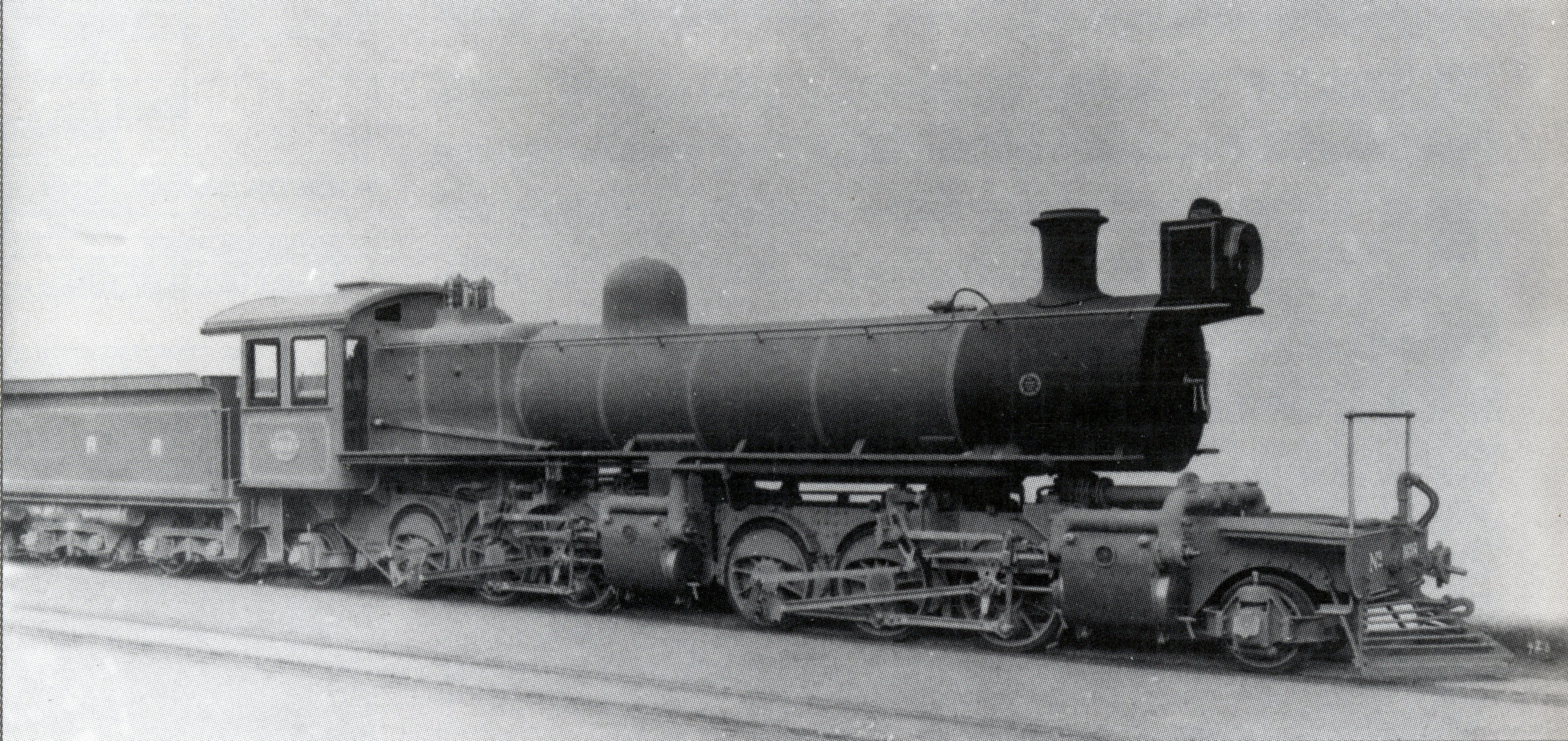
SAR Class ME

- During 1911, the CSAR ordered an experimental simple expansion Mallet from the North British Locomotive Company (NBL). Compared to other South African Mallets, this locomotive was unique, being arranged as a simplex locomotive with four high pressure cylinders instead of the more usual compound expansion arrangement. The locomotive was intended for test purposes on branchlines with light 45 pounds per yard (22 kilograms per metre) rail. It had Walschaerts valve gear, a plate frame and was equipped with a Schmidt superheater. By the time it was delivered in January 1912, the CSAR had already become part of the newly established SAR, who designated it the sole Class ME.
- In 1915, the SAR placed five Class MH compound Mallets in service, designed in detail in the locomotive drawing office in Pretoria under the direction of D.A. Hendrie, Chief Mechanical Engineer (CME) of the SAR from 1910 to 1922. They were superheated and had Walschaerts valve gear. The locomotives were built by NBL and erected in the Salvokop shops in Pretoria. At the time of their introduction, the Class MH was the largest and most powerful locomotive in the world on Cape gauge, with a full working order weight of 179.6 long tons (182.5 tonnes; 201.2 short tons). i.0/}+"P:

=== Serbia: 2 ft 6 in gauge ===
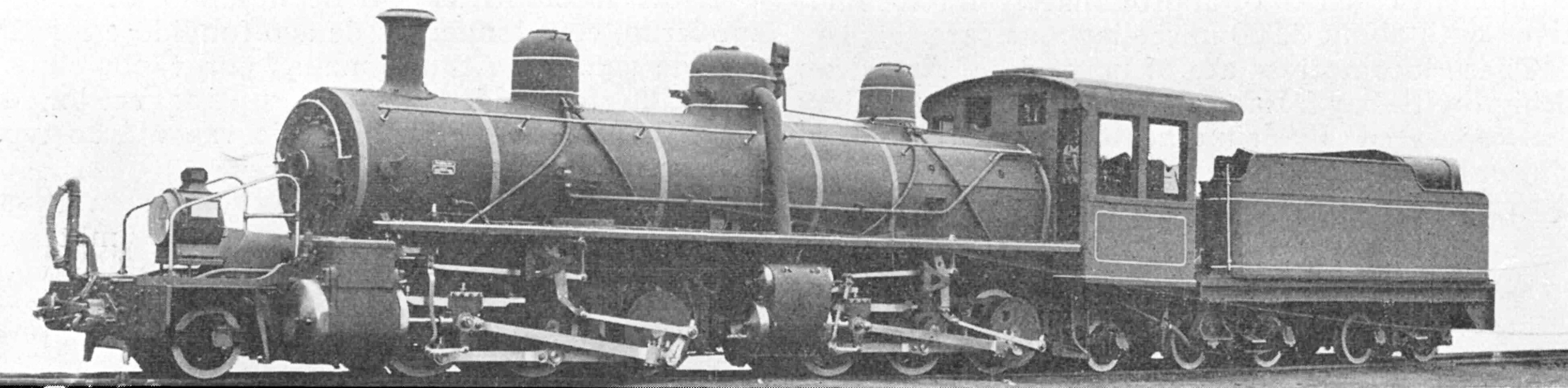
Serbian narrow gauge 2-6-6-2 compound Mallet

The Serbian government used 10 Mallet articulated compound locomotives for freight service on 2 ft 6 in (762 mm) narrow gauge. They were built in 1915 for the Serbian government by the American Locomotive Company (ALCO).

=== Soviet Union: 5 foot gauge ===
A modern but compact 2-6-6-2 Mallet, class P34, was one of several experimental locomotives built in 1949 in the Soviet Union. Only one was built, by Kolomna Locomotive Works in Moscow. Track gauge was 5 ft (1,524 mm).

== HO scale models ==
A drawing of the Great Northern Class L-1 2-6-6-2 (engine only) in HO scale was published in Model Railroader in October 1953, followed by article on building the engine in April 1955.

Mantua Metal Products marketed models of both tender and tank versions of the 2-6-6-2 type. The brand was later acquired by MRC (Model Rectifier Corp.) and later Lionel.

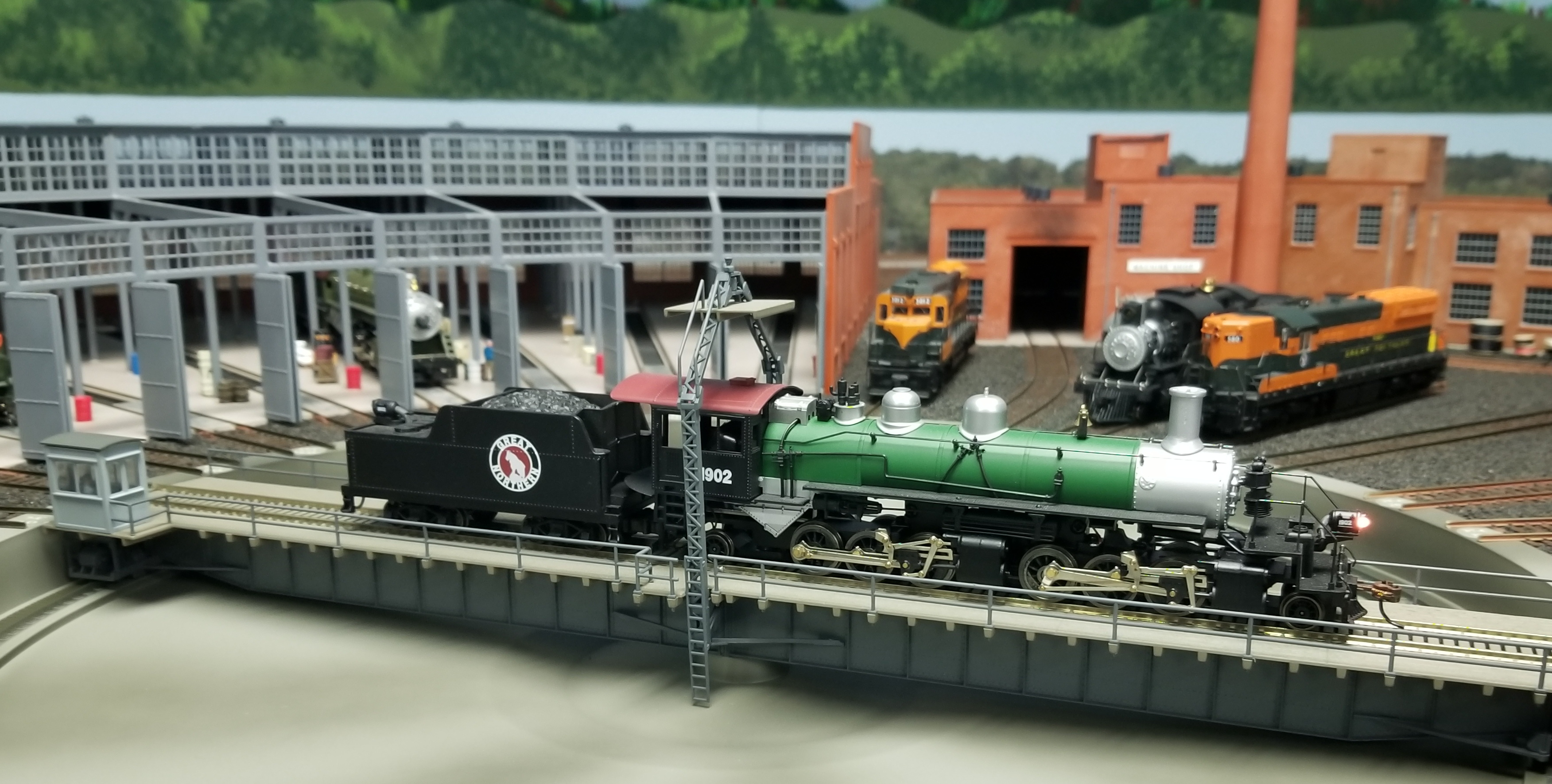
Mantua HO scale model of 2-6-6-2 steam locomotive, lettered for Great Northern Railway

The 2-6-6-2 wheel arrangement was fairly popular among model railroaders during the period when brass models were being imported in large quantities from Japan and Korea. Among the leading examples in HO scale were the following.

=== Road locomotives ===
==== Imported 1955 to 1974 ====
- Chesapeake & Ohio class H-6 -- Made by Atlas/Ashai, imported by Pacific Fast Mail (PFM) -- 2177 copies
- Chesapeake & Ohio class H-5 / USRA—Made by Akane and Fuji Models, imported by Gem—188 copies
- Great Northern class L-2 -- Made by Atlas/KTM, imported by PFM—129 copies

==== Imported 1978 to 1985 ====
- Baltimore & Ohio class KK-4b—Made by Samhongsha, imported by Key—75 copies
- Chesapeake & Ohio—Made by Samhongsha, imported by Key—35 class H-4, 150 class H-6
- Chesapeake & Ohio class H-5 / USRA—Made by Samhongsha, imported by Key—75 copies
- Denver & Rio Grande Western class L-96 / Norfolk & Western class Z-1a—Made by Dai Young, imported by Custom Brass—300 copies
- Great Northern class L-1 -- Made by Tenshodo, imported by PFM—500 copies
- New York Central class NE-2 -- Made by Dai Young, imported by Custom Brass—300 copies
- Nickel Plate class I-3 -- Made by Samhongsha, imported by Key—50 copies
- Southern Pacific class MM-3 -- Made by Daeki, imported by Nickel Plate Products—100 copies
- Western Pacific class M-80—Made by Samhongsha, imported by Key -- #201 65 copies, #206 65 copies

=== Logging locomotives ===
==== Imported 1959 to 1975 ====
- 2-6-6-2 (tender) Sierra—Made by United, imported by PFM—6142 copies
- 2-6-6-2 (tender) Kosmos Timber Co—Made by Toby, imported by North West Short Line (NWSL) -- 708 copies
- 2-6-6-2T (tank) Various owners—Made by Toby, imported by NWSL—1302 copies

==== Imported 1978 to 1985 ====
- 2-6-6-2 (tender) Rayonier—Made by United, imported by PFM—150 copies
- 2-6-6-2 (tender) CSF&E -- Imported by Sunset—400 copies
- 2-6-6-2T (tank) Hammond Lumber Co—Dai Young, imported by Custom Brass—1302 copies

The "second generation" of imported brass locomotives, beginning about 1975, were imported for a wider variety of roads and locomotive classes, with closer attention to detail. This led to smaller production lots over which to allocate the research and design costs and consequently, significantly higher list prices. In this period production shifted from Japan to Korea to reduce labor costs.

== O scale models ==
An O scale model of a Great Northern 2-6-6-2 was built by Kumata & Co. as their item E-330-A and imported by Custom Brass in 1979. Fifty copies were built.

Lionel introduced a model following USRA design, lettered Norfolk & Western #1409, SKU: 6–11339, and Weyerhaeuser #120, SKU 2421250. Standard O scale, introduced 2011. The discussion on their web site seems to indicate that C&O and W&LE engines were also offered. As discussed above, the USRA engines were initially allocated to C&O and W&LE, later Nickel Plate; Norfolk & Western did not receive any.

== See also ==
- USRA 2-6-6-2
- List of South African locomotive classes
