= South African Class MD 2-6-6-2 =

1910 articulated steam locomotive

CSAR Mallet 2-6-6-2 Saturated South African Class MD 2-6-6-2
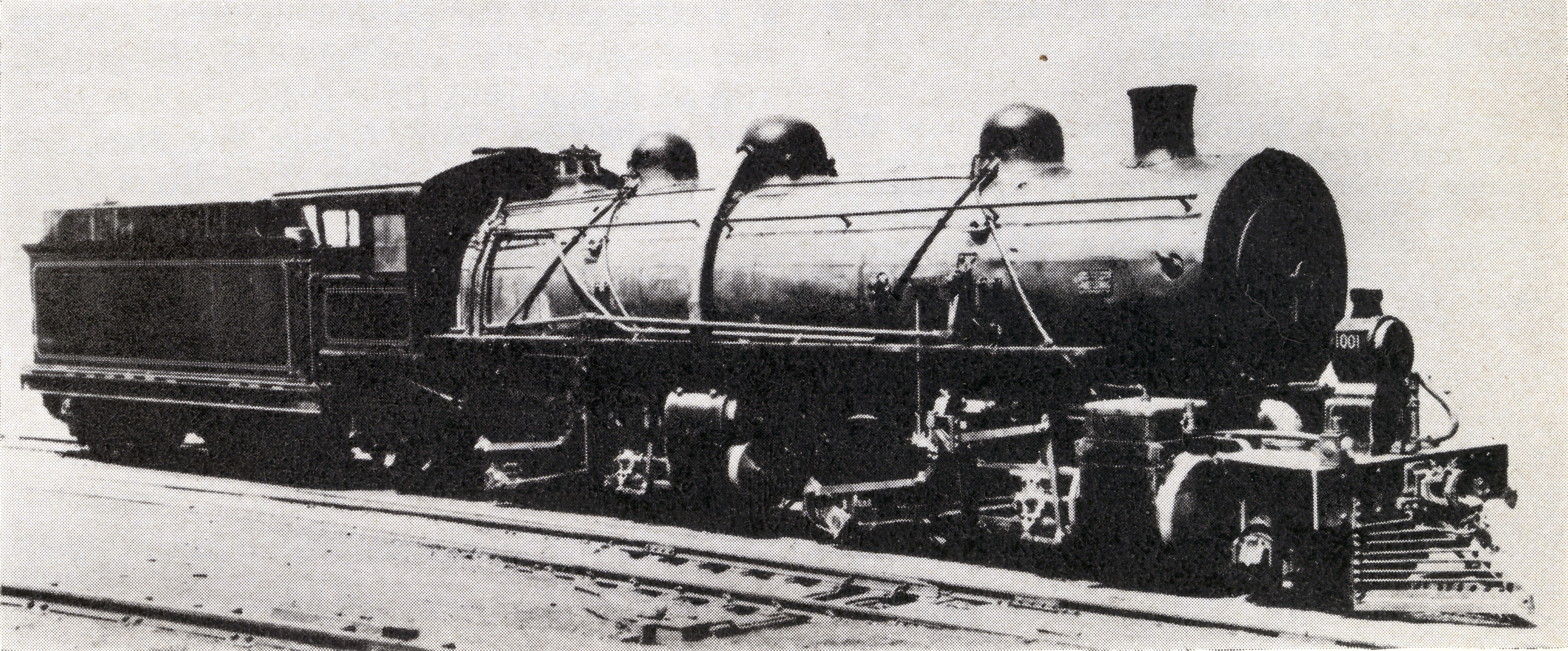
- CSAR no. 1001, SAR no. 1617, c. 1910
Type and origin
- Power type: Steam
- Designer: American Locomotive Company
- Builder: American Locomotive Company
- Serial number: 46581
- Model: CSAR Mallet
- Build date: 1910
- Total produced: 1
Specifications
- Configuration
  - Whyte: 2-6-6-2 (Prairie Mallet)
  - UIC: (1'C)C1'nv4
- Driver: 3rd & 6th coupled axles
- Gauge: 3 ft 6 in (1,067 mm) Cape gauge
- Leading dia.: 28 1/2 in (724 mm)
- Coupled dia.: 46 in (1,168 mm)
- Trailing dia.: 28 1/2 in (724 mm)
- Tender wheels: 33 1/2 in (851 mm)
- Minimum curve: 350 ft (107 m)
- Wheelbase: 65 ft 6 in (19,964 mm)
  - Engine: 40 ft 3 in (12,268 mm)
  - Coupled: 8 ft 4 in (2,540 mm) each
  - Tender: 17 ft 11 in (5,461 mm)
  - Tender bogie: 4 ft 7 in (1,397 mm)
- Length
  - Over couplers: 73 ft 7 1/4 in (22,435 mm)
- Height: 12 ft 10 3/8 in (3,921 mm)
- Frame type: Bar
- Axle load: 15 LT 0 cwt 2 qtr (15,270 kg)
  - Leading: 7 LT 14 cwt 3 qtr (7,862 kg)
  - 1st coupled: 14 LT 9 cwt 3 qtr (14,720 kg)
  - 2nd coupled: 14 LT 2 cwt 2 qtr (14,350 kg)
  - 3rd coupled: 13 LT 17 cwt 1 qtr (14,080 kg)
  - 4th coupled: 15 LT 0 cwt 2 qtr (15,270 kg)
  - 5th coupled: 14 LT 11 cwt 1 qtr (14,800 kg)
  - 6th coupled: 14 LT 10 cwt 3 qtr (14,770 kg)
  - Trailing: 6 LT 7 cwt 3 qtr (6,490 kg)
  - Tender axle: 14 LT 3 cwt 1 qtr (14,390 kg) av.
- Adhesive weight: 86 LT 12 cwt (87,990 kg)
- Loco weight: 100 LT 14 cwt 2 qtr (102,300 kg)
- Tender weight: 56 LT 14 cwt (57,610 kg)
- Total weight: 157 LT 8 cwt (159,900 kg)
- Tender type: 2-axle bogies
- Fuel type: Coal
- Fuel capacity: 10 LT (10.2 t)
- Water cap.: 5,000 imp gal (23,000 L)
- Firebox
  - Type: Round-top
  - Grate area: 49.5 sq ft (4.60 m^{2})
- Boiler
  - Pitch: 7 ft 9 in (2,362 mm)
  - Diameter: 6 ft 1/8 in (1,832 mm)
  - Tube plates: 19 ft 10 1/8 in (6,048 mm)
  - Small tubes: 271: 2 1/4 in (57 mm)
- Boiler pressure: 200 psi (1,379 kPa)
- Safety valve: Ramsbottom
- Heating surface
  - Firebox: 156 sq ft (14.5 m^{2})
  - Tubes: 3,169 sq ft (294.4 m^{2})
  - Total surface: 3,325 sq ft (308.9 m^{2})
- Cylinders: Four
- High-pressure cylinder: 18 in (457 mm) bore 26 in (660 mm) stroke
- Low-pressure cylinder: 28 1/2 in (724 mm) bore 26 in (660 mm) stroke
- Valve gear: Walschaerts
- Valve type: HP Piston; LP Richardson balanced slide
- Valve travel: HP 5 in (127 mm); LP 5 1/2 in (140 mm)
- Valve lap: HP 1 in (25 mm); LP 7/8 in (22 mm)
- Couplers: Johnston link-and-pin
Performance figures
- Tractive effort: 45,900 lbf (204 kN) @ 50%
Career
- Operators: Central South African Railways; South African Railways
- Class: Class MD
- Number in class: 1
- Numbers: CSAR 1001, SAR 1617
- Delivered: 1910
- First run: 1910
- Withdrawn: 1926

The South African Railways Class MD 2-6-6-2 of 1910 was a steam locomotive from the pre-Union era in Transvaal.

In March 1910, the Central South African Railways commissioned a single experimental Mallet articulated compound steam locomotive with a 2-6-6-2 wheel arrangement. In 1912, when the locomotive was assimilated into the South African Railways, it was renumbered and designated Class MD.

== Manufacturer ==
The first Mallet articulated compound steam locomotive on the Central South African Railways (CSAR) was ordered for test purposes from the American Locomotive Company in 1910. It was numbered 1001 and placed in service in March 1910. With its full working order weight of 157 long tons (160 tonnes), it was the heaviest locomotive in the world working on Cape gauge at the time.

== Compound expansion ==
In a compound locomotive, steam is expanded in phases. After being expanded in a high-pressure cylinder and having then lost pressure and given up part of its heat, it is exhausted into a larger-volume low-pressure cylinder for secondary expansion, after which it is exhausted through the smokebox. By comparison, in the more usual arrangement of simple expansion (simplex), steam is expanded just once in any one cylinder before being exhausted through the smokebox.

In the compound Mallet locomotive, the rear set of coupled wheels are driven by the smaller high-pressure cylinders which are fed steam from the steam dome. Their spent steam is then fed to the larger low-pressure cylinders which drive the front set of coupled wheels.

== Characteristics ==
The bar frames of the rear engine unit and its high-pressure cylinders were rigidly attached to the boiler with the engine's wide firebox extending over the coupled wheels. The front engine unit and its low-pressure cylinders were not rigidly attached to the boiler barrel, but carried the boiler on a single sliding bearing which was placed between the leading and intermediate coupled wheels. The underside of the smokebox was flattened to provide clearance between it and the cylinder assemblies of the front engine unit. The two engine units were coupled together by a single vertical pin connection, arranged at a point on the centre-line of the high-pressure cylinder saddle casting. This arrangement gave the locomotive a short rigid wheelbase of 8 feet 4 inches (2,540 millimetres) which made it capable of traversing curves of short radius.

The locomotive used saturated steam. The high-pressure cylinders had piston valves arranged above the cylinders, while the low-pressure cylinders had Allen Richardson balanced slide valves, also arranged above the cylinders and all actuated by Walschaerts valve gear. Copper steam pipes were arranged on each side of the dome and passed vertically down outside the boiler to the steam chests of the high-pressure cylinders. The exhaust from the high-pressure cylinders passed through a receiver pipe along the centre of the engine to the low-pressure cylinders. The exhaust from the low-pressure cylinders passed to the smokebox and blast pipe through a pipe fitted with flexible connections.

The firebox had a short combustion chamber. The boiler barrel was telescopic and made up in three courses from 5/8 inch (16 millimetres), 11/16 inch (17 millimetres) and 3/4 inch (19 millimetres) thick plate respectively. The Walschaerts valve motion was operated by hand screw gear, with the reversing gear for one engine unit's set of gear arranged to be raised while the other's was lowered for forward or reverse, thereby balancing each other.

== Performance ==
At low speed, the locomotive proved to be capable of handling heavier trains than any of the existing CSAR fleet of goods locomotives, but at higher speeds of 25 to 30 miles per hour (40 to 48 kilometres per hour) it could not compete successfully because of excessive wear on the moving parts which resulted in failures and as a consequence, high maintenance cost. Part of the problem arose from the fact that the Mallet was expected to run to the same train schedules as the non-articulated locomotive fleet in spite of the fact that its smaller coupled wheels made it more suited to heavy low-speed work. It has been surmised that, had it been superheated and equipped with larger diameter coupled wheels, the results may have been much better.

== Service ==
The Mallet was acquired as an experiment, the ultimate object being to improve traffic flow on the 80 miles (129 kilometres) coal line between Witbank and Germiston. The increase of traffic and the resultant congestion on this line with a ruling gradient of 1 in 100 (1%) was causing considerable delays en route, which led to excessive hours of duty being imposed on crews. The intent was to determine the feasibility of replacing the existing Class 11 locomotives on this line with more powerful Mallets to be able to increase train loads from 900 to 1,600 long tons (914 to 1,626 tonnes).

== South African Railways ==
Railway network of the Central South African Railways in 1910 upon the establishment of the Union of South Africa and the South African Railways

When the Union of South Africa was established on 31 May 1910, the three Colonial government railways (Cape Government Railways, Natal Government Railways and CSAR) were united under a single administration to control and administer the railways, ports and harbours of the Union. Although the South African Railways and Harbours came into existence in 1910, the actual classification and renumbering of all the rolling stock of the three constituent railways were only implemented with effect from 1 January 1912.

While the South African Railways (SAR) came into existence in 1910, the actual classification and renumbering of all the rolling stock of the three constituent railways required careful planning and was only implemented with effect from 1 January 1912.

In 1912, the engine was renumbered 1617 and designated the sole Class MD locomotive on the SAR. It remained in service on the line between Witbank and Germiston until it was withdrawn from service and scrapped in 1926.

== Illustration ==
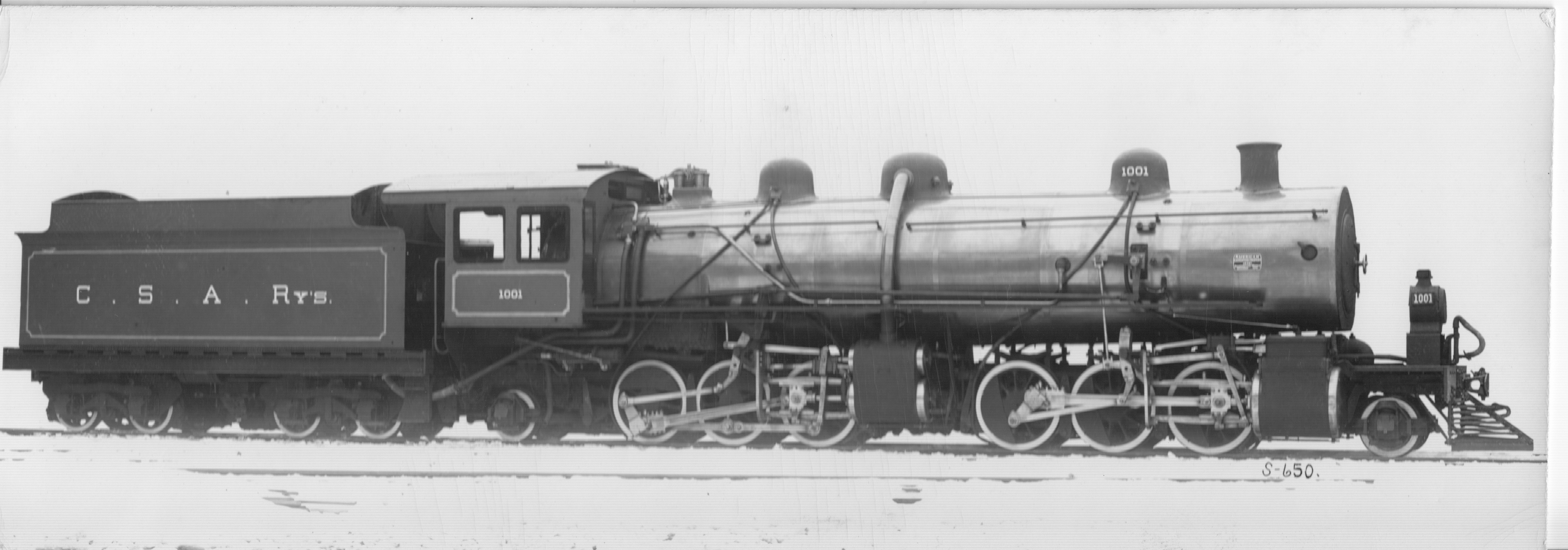
Builder's photo of CSAR no. 1001, c. 1910
