= South African Class 1E =

South African electric locomotive class

South African Classes 1E and 1ES
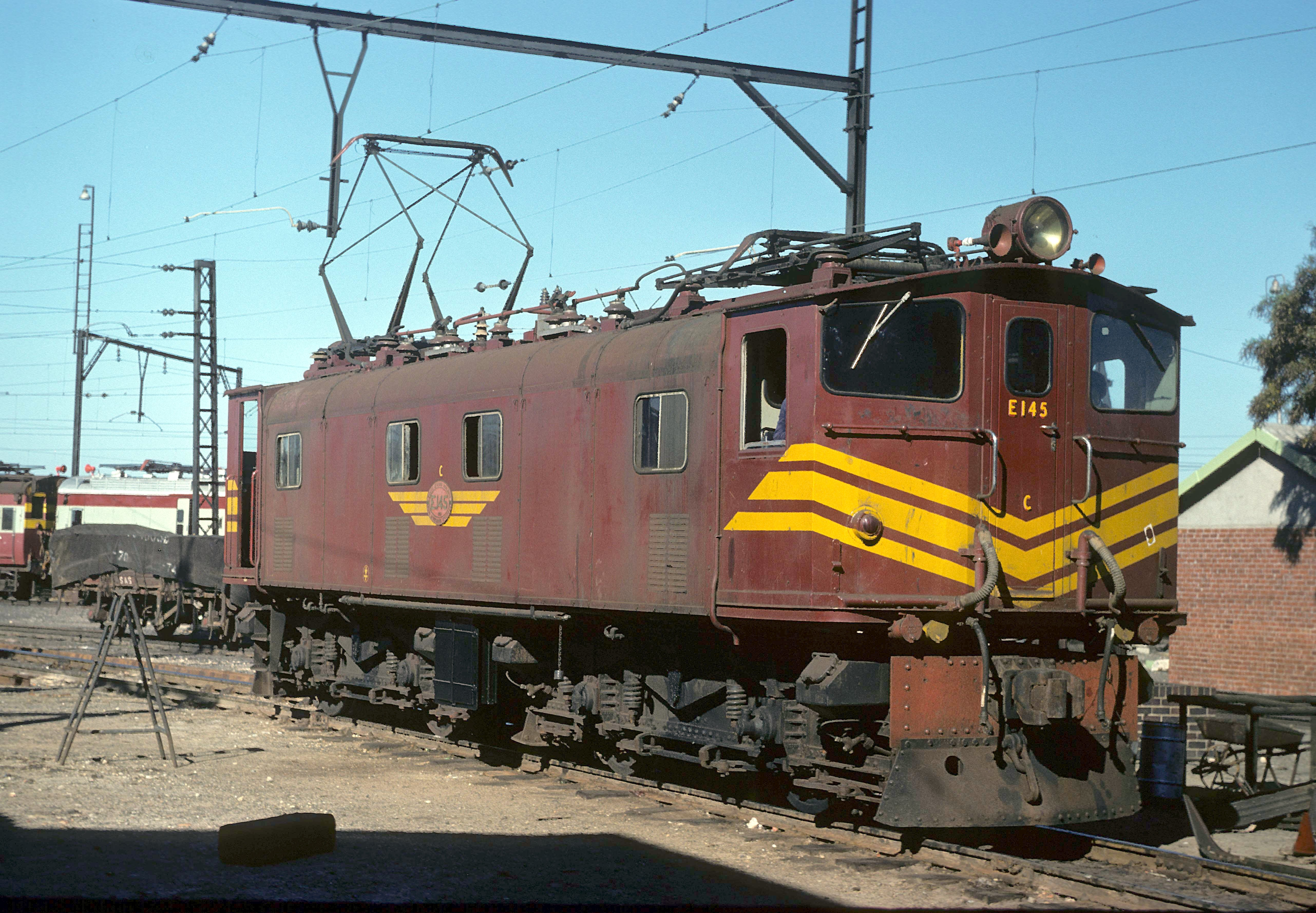
- Class 1ES no. E145 at Salt River, January 1975
Type and origin
- Power type: Electric
- Designer: Metropolitan-Vickers
- Builder: Swiss Locomotive & Machine Works; Metropolitan-Vickers; Werkspoor; Robert Stephenson & Hawthorns
- Serial number: SLM 2875-2934, 3655-3676; WS 747-766; RSH 7181-7190
- Model: Metrovick 1E
- Build date: 1923–1944
- Total produced: 172
- Rebuilder: South African Railways
- Number rebuilt: 35 to Classes 1ES and ES
Specifications
- Configuration
  - AAR: B-B
  - UIC: Bo+Bo
  - Commonwealth: Bo+Bo
- Gauge: 3 ft 6 in (1,067 mm) Cape gauge
- Wheel diameter: 1,219 mm (48 in)
- Minimum curve: 91.45 m (300 ft)
- Wheelbase: 9,423 mm (30 ft 11 in)
  - Bogie: 2,819 mm (9 ft 3 in)
- Pivot centres: 6,604 mm (21 ft 8 in)
- Panto shoes: 8,039 mm (26 ft 4 1/2 in)
- Length
  - Over couplers: 13,310 mm (43 ft 8 in)
  - Over beams: 12,395 mm (40 ft 8 in)
- Width: 2,800 mm (9 ft 2 1/4 in)
- Height
  - Pantograph: 3,962 mm (13 ft 0 in)
  - Body height: 3,480 mm (11 ft 5 in)
- Axle load: 17,018.75 kg (37,519.9 lb)
- Adhesive weight: 68,075 kg (150,080 lb)
- Loco weight: 68,075 kg (150,080 lb)
- Electric system/s: 3 kV DC catenary
- Current pickup(s): Pantographs
- Traction motors: Four MV 182R
  - Rating 1 hour: 224 kW (300 hp)
- Gear ratio: 17:75
- MU working: 4 maximum
- Loco brake: Air, Rheostatic & Regenerative
- Train brakes: Air & Vacuum
- Couplers: Johnston link-and-pin AAR knuckle (1930s)
Performance figures
- Maximum speed: 72 km/h (45 mph)
- Power output
  - 1 hour: 896 kW (1,202 hp)
- Tractive effort
  - Starting: 176 kN (40,000 lbf)
  - 1 hour: 94 kN (21,000 lbf)
  - Continuous: 73 kN (16,000 lbf)
Career
- Operators: South African Railways
- Class: Class 1E, Class 1ES
- Number in class: 172
- Numbers: E1-E95, E98-E122, E139-E190
- Delivered: 1925–1945
- First run: 1925
- Withdrawn: c. 1990

The South African Railways Class 1E of 1925 was an electric locomotive.

Between 1925 and 1945, the South African Railways purchased 172 Class 1E electric locomotives, spread over seven orders. They were the first mainline electric locomotives to be introduced in South Africa.

== Railways electrification ==
In 1920, following a report and recommendations on electric traction by consulting engineers Merz & McLellan of London, the South African Parliament authorised the electrification of the lines between Durban and Pietermaritzburg in Natal and between Cape Town and Simon's Town on the Cape Peninsula at a cost of £4.4 million.

At the time, there were two routes between Pietermaritzburg and Durban. The newer route with its 1 in 66 (1½%) gradients was chosen for electrification over the older route with its 1 in 33 (3%) gradients. Between Cato Ridge and Durban, electrification necessitated the doubling of the track and the construction of ten tunnels as well as the construction of long stretches of cutting and embankment across difficult terrain.

After it was pointed out that the Natal traffic bottleneck was really above rather than below Pietermaritzburg, electrification in Natal eventually first took place between that city and Glencoe. It was a mountainous 171-mile-long (275-kilometre) single-track section which carried heavy mineral traffic towards the port of Durban on an alignment with severe gradients and tight curves where the existing working by steam locomotives became too slow and inefficient to keep up with increasing traffic.

Work commenced in 1922 and the first electric train on that section was run in November 1925.The whole section was in full electric operation by January 1927. Electrification of the Simon's Town line commenced in March 1927 and full electric operation was introduced during September 1928. Electrification of the new mainline section from Pietermaritzburg to Durban via Delville Wood was completed in 1936 and the first electrically hauled passenger train entered Durban station on 2 December of that year. Electrification of the original Natal Government Railways mainline from Rossburgh to Cato Ridge was commenced soon after the new mainline was energised, but during the Second World War the work was halted and not restarted until the late 1950s, eventually being switched on in May 1959.

=== Benefits ===
An important consideration in deciding upon the economics of electrification was the potential saving in wage-bills. Electrification would reduce the required crew roster from 300 drivers and stokers to 170 drivers and assistants. In addition it was expected that a large reduction in overtime would be accomplished by increasing the average train speeds from steam traction's 8 miles per hour (13 kilometres per hour) to electric traction's 21 miles per hour (34 kilometres per hour) on the Glencoe to Pietermaritzburg section, with slightly higher future speeds anticipated. It was further estimated that the total capacity of the line would be increased by 60%.

=== Colenso power station ===
The chosen overhead power supply was 3 kV DC, the highest direct current overhead voltage in use at the time. The Colenso power station was built by the SAR specifically to power this line. The complete electrical system for the section consisted of the coal power station at Colenso which generated three-phase 50 Hz current at 6.6 kV AC, stepped up and distributed at 88 kV AC to twelve automatic substations along the route. The substations were located at an average of about 15 miles (24 kilometres) apart and all but one were supplied at 88 kV by two separate three-phase transmission lines. The one at Colenso was fed 6.6 kV AC directly from the power station.

At the substations, the current was stepped down again to 6.6 kV AC, converted by synchronous motor generators to 3 kV DC and fed to the overhead catenary for use by the electric locomotives. The overhead equipment consisted of a copper catenary which supported a copper contact wire by means of droppers. The track structures were steel lattice masts erected on concrete foundations.

== Manufacturers ==
South Africa's first electric locomotive, the Class 1E, entered service in Natal in 1925. The locomotive was designed by Metropolitan-Vickers (Metrovick) of Manchester while the mechanical parts of the unit were approved by, Chief Mechanical Engineer of the South African Railways (SAR) F.R. Collins. At the time, the first batch of 78 Class 1E, Series 1 locomotives constituted the largest order for a single type of electric locomotive to have been placed anywhere in the world. The eventual fleet of 172 locomotives was built for the SAR in seven series by four manufacturers over a period of twenty years.

- Series 1. The first sixty locomotives, numbered in the range from E1 to E60, were built by the Swiss Locomotive & Machine Works (SLM) in 1923 and 1924. The remaining eighteen Series 1 locomotives, numbered in the range from E61 to E78, were built by Metropolitan-Vickers in 1925.
- Series 2. All seventeen locomotives, numbered in the range from E79 to E95, were built by Metropolitan-Vickers in 1925 and 1926 and entered service in 1927. These units were slightly heavier than those of Series 1.
- Series 3. Five locomotives, numbered in the range from E98 to E102, were built by Metropolitan-Vickers in 1936. The skipped numbers E96 and E97 were allocated to Class ES locomotives.
- Series 4. Twenty locomotives, numbered in the range from E103 to E122, were built by Metropolitan-Vickers in 1936.
- Series 5. Twenty-two locomotives, numbered in the range from E139 to E160, were built by SLM in 1938. The skipped numbers in the range from E123 to E138 were allocated to Classes ES1, ES, 2E, DS and DS1 locomotives.
- Series 6. Twenty locomotives, numbered in the range from E161 to E180, were built by the Nederlandsche Fabriek van Werktuigen en Spoorwegmaterieel (Werkspoor) in 1938.
- Series 7. Ten locomotives, numbered in the range from E181 to E190, were built by Robert Stephenson & Hawthorns in 1944 and entered service in 1945. These units were built under austerity measures during World War II and, on account of wartime transport difficulties, were shipped in a disassembled condition. Body panels, frames and partitions were crated flat, together with bundles of tubing, copper bus-bar, coils of wire and cable, and general electrical equipment. The bogies were shipped partially assembled. The mechanical erection of these units was done by the Mechanical Engineer at the Pietermaritzburg shops after which the units were towed to Danskraal for the assembly of electrical equipment.

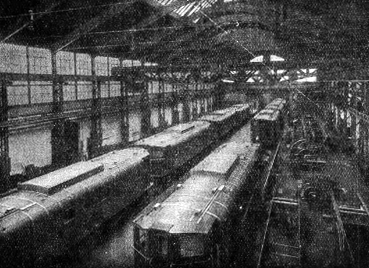
SAR 1E locomotives being built by SLM at Winterthur, 1923

== Characteristics ==
The locomotives were operated as single units on light local passenger trains, double-headed on mainline passenger trains and light goods trains or triple-headed on heavy goods trains.

=== Interior layout ===
The interior layout consisted of five compartments.

- The driving cabs at each end contained the control gear, meters, gauges, vacuum brake valves and other equipment and were connected by a side corridor along the right side of the locomotive when looking towards Cab 1.
- The high tension compartment was in the middle of the locomotive and contained the high voltage control switches and resistances, accessed through a sliding door which was both mechanically and electrically interlocked to prevent it being opened while a pantograph was in contact with the overhead catenary.
- A machinery compartment behind each cab housed auxiliary gear such as two motor generator sets, one of 16 kilowatts (21 horsepower) and the other of 28 kilowatts (38 horsepower), each coupled to a blower fan on its shaft for ventilating the main motors. In addition it contained a motor-driven rotary vacuum exhauster, air compressor, air reservoirs for the brakes, low-tension control contactors and resistances for the auxiliaries and battery, together with contactor gear for controlling the field of the larger motor generator.

The sections of the roof above the compartments and the clerestory roof above the high tension compartment were removable to enable heavy machinery or control gear to be lifted out for repair.

=== Orientation ===
These dual cab locomotives had four grilles below the four windows on the equipment side and only two grilles below the centre two windows on the corridor side. When observing the locomotive from the side with four grilles, the no. 1 end would be to the left.

=== Bogies ===
Like the subsequent Classes 2E, 3E and 4E, the Class 1E had bogie mounted draft gear. It had a Bo+Bo wheel arrangement with an articulated inter-bogie linkage, therefore no train forces were transmitted directly to the locomotive body. The bogie pivot centres were 6,604 millimetres (21 feet 8 inches) apart. One of the bottom pivot centres was fixed while the other was free to move longitudinally to allow for any wear occurring in the articulated coupling between the two bogies.

Three different cowcatchers were used on Class 1E units. The first six series were delivered with cowcatchers made up of horizontal bars. The Series 7 units were delivered with a plain plate type cowcatcher, but the bogies were sometimes interchanged during overhauls with the result that units from different orders often carried cowcatchers not as originally fitted. In later years, units were often fitted with boiler-tube cowcatchers made up of vertically mounted short pieces of boiler tube, similar to those that were fitted on most South African steam locomotives after World War II.

=== Traction motors ===
The four-pole traction motors each operated at 1.5 kV. They were electrically coupled in pairs, two in series across the 3 kV supply line.

=== Braking ===
The locomotive used air brakes. Air connections between units were arranged in the main reservoir circuit so that air could be supplied to another unit in the event of failure of its compressor. For train braking, it also made use of regenerative braking which enabled higher speeds to be allowed on down grades, while reducing the dependence on the train's vacuum or air braking system and with the collateral benefit of savings in electricity consumption. The usual speeds during regeneration were 14 and 28 miles per hour (23 and 45 kilometres per hour) for goods and passenger working respectively. It was reportedly the first extensive use in regular traffic of electric locomotives equipped for multiple unit operation with regenerative braking.

=== Sanding ===
Sanding was arranged for multiple control with electrically operated sand valves to enable multiple unit coupled locomotives to sand simultaneously.

=== Lighting ===
Lighting was supplied from a 110 V circuit which was fed by the 16 kilowatts (21 horsepower) generator in parallel with 110 V lead acid batteries. The batteries were mounted in cases suspended underneath the locomotive body between the bogies. This generator also supplied power to the control circuits, exhauster, compressor and cab heaters.

== Service ==
Early models bore number plates inscribed in English only. By 1938 when the Series 5 locomotives entered service, Afrikaans had been accepted as South Africa's second official language and new locomotives bore bilingual number plates.

While they were employed mainly in Natal, some of the Class 1E units later also worked on the Witwatersrand and eventually also in the Western Cape. From early 1955, as the new Class 5E began to take over the Natal mainline, several Class 1Es were transferred to the Western Transvaal System to work as haulers on cross-Reef trips to transfer loads from yard to yard. Some of them covered more than 8,000,000 kilometres (5,000,000 miles) during their service lives.

By the late 1960s some efforts were being made to keep steam locomotives out of the central Durban city areas and North Coast loads would be moved between the Bayhead marshalling yards and Stamford Hill by electric haulers. Steam would work goods trains north from there on the North Coast mainline. By 1969, the line to Stanger had been electrified, allowing Empangeni trains to be worked that far by electric units.

=== Modification ===
They served in both goods and passenger service. Since their top speed of 72 kilometres per hour (45 miles per hour) was considered too slow for fast passenger service on the mail trains, two Class 1E units, numbers E121 and E122, were modified in 1936 by changing their gear ratio to enable them to run at speeds of up to 90 kilometres per hour (56 miles per hour). This appeared to be the practical limit for this type of electric locomotive.

=== Reclassification ===
All together 35 of the Class 1E locomotives were eventually withdrawn from mainline service, modified and reclassified to Class 1ES for use as shunting locomotives. The modifications included alteration of the resistance grids in the electrical circuit and enlarged and widened cabs, but the gear ratios were not altered. Apart from the wider cabs, the modified Class 1ES locomotives were identifiable by their front windows with slanted upper edges compared to the rectangular front windows of the Class 1E.

=== Rebuilding ===
In 1964, two of these Class 1ES locomotives were rebuilt to centre-cab Class ES shunting locomotives.

=== Withdrawal ===
All the Class 1E and Class 1ES locomotives were withdrawn from service by 1990.

== Series-specific data ==
The Class 1E builders, works numbers, years of construction and modifications to Classes ES and 1ES are listed in the table. The axle load and adhesive weight as shown under "Specifications" in the infobox may be considered as average figures for the Class 1E since these weights varied between the seven series. In respect of the Series 1 to 6 locomotives, the actual load per axle of each bogie and the total locomotive mass are included in the table below.

Classes 1E and Class 1ES, Series 1 to 7
Class	Series	Loco no.	Builder	Works no.	Year built	Axle loads Bogie 1	Axle loads Bogie 2	Adhesive weight	Rebuilt to
1E	1	E1	SLM	2875	1923	16 LT 12 cwt (16,900 kg)	16 LT 13 cwt (16,900 kg)	66 LT 14 cwt (67,800 kg)	
1E	1	E2	SLM	2876	1923	16 LT 12 cwt (16,900 kg)	16 LT 13 cwt (16,900 kg)	66 LT 14 cwt (67,800 kg)	
1E	1	E3	SLM	2877	1923	16 LT 12 cwt (16,900 kg)	16 LT 13 cwt (16,900 kg)	66 LT 14 cwt (67,800 kg)	
1E	1	E4	SLM	2878	1923	16 LT 12 cwt (16,900 kg)	16 LT 13 cwt (16,900 kg)	66 LT 14 cwt (67,800 kg)	
1E	1	E5	SLM	2879	1923	16 LT 12 cwt (16,900 kg)	16 LT 13 cwt (16,900 kg)	66 LT 14 cwt (67,800 kg)	
1E	1	E6	SLM	2880	1923	16 LT 12 cwt (16,900 kg)	16 LT 13 cwt (16,900 kg)	66 LT 14 cwt (67,800 kg)	
1E	1	E7	SLM	2881	1923	16 LT 12 cwt (16,900 kg)	16 LT 13 cwt (16,900 kg)	66 LT 14 cwt (67,800 kg)	
1E	1	E8	SLM	2882	1923	16 LT 12 cwt (16,900 kg)	16 LT 13 cwt (16,900 kg)	66 LT 14 cwt (67,800 kg)	
1E	1	E9	SLM	2883	1923	16 LT 12 cwt (16,900 kg)	16 LT 13 cwt (16,900 kg)	66 LT 14 cwt (67,800 kg)	
1E	1	E10	SLM	2884	1923	16 LT 12 cwt (16,900 kg)	16 LT 13 cwt (16,900 kg)	66 LT 14 cwt (67,800 kg)	
1E	1	E11	SLM	2885	1923	16 LT 12 cwt (16,900 kg)	16 LT 13 cwt (16,900 kg)	66 LT 14 cwt (67,800 kg)	
1E	1	E12	SLM	2886	1923	16 LT 12 cwt (16,900 kg)	16 LT 13 cwt (16,900 kg)	66 LT 14 cwt (67,800 kg)	
1E	1	E13	SLM	2887	1923	16 LT 12 cwt (16,900 kg)	16 LT 13 cwt (16,900 kg)	66 LT 14 cwt (67,800 kg)	
1E	1	E14	SLM	2888	1923	16 LT 12 cwt (16,900 kg)	16 LT 13 cwt (16,900 kg)	66 LT 14 cwt (67,800 kg)	
1E	1	E15	SLM	2889	1923	16 LT 12 cwt (16,900 kg)	16 LT 13 cwt (16,900 kg)	66 LT 14 cwt (67,800 kg)	
1E	1	E16	SLM	2890	1923	16 LT 12 cwt (16,900 kg)	16 LT 13 cwt (16,900 kg)	66 LT 14 cwt (67,800 kg)	
1E	1	E17	SLM	2891	1923	16 LT 12 cwt (16,900 kg)	16 LT 13 cwt (16,900 kg)	66 LT 14 cwt (67,800 kg)	
1E	1	E18	SLM	2892	1923	16 LT 12 cwt (16,900 kg)	16 LT 13 cwt (16,900 kg)	66 LT 14 cwt (67,800 kg)	
1E	1	E19	SLM	2893	1923	16 LT 12 cwt (16,900 kg)	16 LT 13 cwt (16,900 kg)	66 LT 14 cwt (67,800 kg)	
1E	1	E20	SLM	2894	1923	16 LT 12 cwt (16,900 kg)	16 LT 13 cwt (16,900 kg)	66 LT 14 cwt (67,800 kg)	
1E	1	E21	SLM	2895	1923	16 LT 12 cwt (16,900 kg)	16 LT 13 cwt (16,900 kg)	66 LT 14 cwt (67,800 kg)	
1E	1	E22	SLM	2896	1923	16 LT 12 cwt (16,900 kg)	16 LT 13 cwt (16,900 kg)	66 LT 14 cwt (67,800 kg)	
1E	1	E23	SLM	2897	1923	16 LT 12 cwt (16,900 kg)	16 LT 13 cwt (16,900 kg)	66 LT 14 cwt (67,800 kg)	
1E	1	E24	SLM	2898	1923	16 LT 12 cwt (16,900 kg)	16 LT 13 cwt (16,900 kg)	66 LT 14 cwt (67,800 kg)	
1E	1	E25	SLM	2899	1923	16 LT 12 cwt (16,900 kg)	16 LT 13 cwt (16,900 kg)	66 LT 14 cwt (67,800 kg)	
1E	1	E26	SLM	2900	1923	16 LT 12 cwt (16,900 kg)	16 LT 13 cwt (16,900 kg)	66 LT 14 cwt (67,800 kg)	
1E	1	E27	SLM	2901	1923	16 LT 12 cwt (16,900 kg)	16 LT 13 cwt (16,900 kg)	66 LT 14 cwt (67,800 kg)	
1E	1	E28	SLM	2902	1923	16 LT 12 cwt (16,900 kg)	16 LT 13 cwt (16,900 kg)	66 LT 14 cwt (67,800 kg)	
1E	1	E29	SLM	2903	1923	16 LT 12 cwt (16,900 kg)	16 LT 13 cwt (16,900 kg)	66 LT 14 cwt (67,800 kg)	
1E	1	E30	SLM	2904	1923	16 LT 12 cwt (16,900 kg)	16 LT 13 cwt (16,900 kg)	66 LT 14 cwt (67,800 kg)	
1E	1	E31	SLM	2905	1923	16 LT 12 cwt (16,900 kg)	16 LT 13 cwt (16,900 kg)	66 LT 14 cwt (67,800 kg)	
1E	1	E32	SLM	2906	1923	16 LT 12 cwt (16,900 kg)	16 LT 13 cwt (16,900 kg)	66 LT 14 cwt (67,800 kg)	
1E	1	E33	SLM	2907	1923	16 LT 12 cwt (16,900 kg)	16 LT 13 cwt (16,900 kg)	66 LT 14 cwt (67,800 kg)	
1E	1	E34	SLM	2908	1923	16 LT 12 cwt (16,900 kg)	16 LT 13 cwt (16,900 kg)	66 LT 14 cwt (67,800 kg)	
1E	1	E35	SLM	2909	1923	16 LT 12 cwt (16,900 kg)	16 LT 13 cwt (16,900 kg)	66 LT 14 cwt (67,800 kg)	
1E	1	E36	SLM	2910	1923	16 LT 12 cwt (16,900 kg)	16 LT 13 cwt (16,900 kg)	66 LT 14 cwt (67,800 kg)	
1E	1	E37	SLM	2911	1923	16 LT 12 cwt (16,900 kg)	16 LT 13 cwt (16,900 kg)	66 LT 14 cwt (67,800 kg)	
1E	1	E38	SLM	2912	1923	16 LT 12 cwt (16,900 kg)	16 LT 13 cwt (16,900 kg)	66 LT 14 cwt (67,800 kg)	
1E	1	E39	SLM	2913	1923	16 LT 12 cwt (16,900 kg)	16 LT 13 cwt (16,900 kg)	66 LT 14 cwt (67,800 kg)	
1E	1	E40	SLM	2914	1923	16 LT 12 cwt (16,900 kg)	16 LT 13 cwt (16,900 kg)	66 LT 14 cwt (67,800 kg)	
1E	1	E41	SLM	2915	1923	16 LT 12 cwt (16,900 kg)	16 LT 13 cwt (16,900 kg)	66 LT 14 cwt (67,800 kg)	
1E	1	E42	SLM	2916	1923	16 LT 12 cwt (16,900 kg)	16 LT 13 cwt (16,900 kg)	66 LT 14 cwt (67,800 kg)	
1E	1	E43	SLM	2917	1923	16 LT 12 cwt (16,900 kg)	16 LT 13 cwt (16,900 kg)	66 LT 14 cwt (67,800 kg)	
1E	1	E44	SLM	2918	1923	16 LT 12 cwt (16,900 kg)	16 LT 13 cwt (16,900 kg)	66 LT 14 cwt (67,800 kg)	
1E	1	E45	SLM	2919	1923	16 LT 12 cwt (16,900 kg)	16 LT 13 cwt (16,900 kg)	66 LT 14 cwt (67,800 kg)	
1E	1	E46	SLM	2920	1923	16 LT 12 cwt (16,900 kg)	16 LT 13 cwt (16,900 kg)	66 LT 14 cwt (67,800 kg)	
1E	1	E47	SLM	2921	1923	16 LT 12 cwt (16,900 kg)	16 LT 13 cwt (16,900 kg)	66 LT 14 cwt (67,800 kg)	
1E	1	E48	SLM	2922	1923	16 LT 12 cwt (16,900 kg)	16 LT 13 cwt (16,900 kg)	66 LT 14 cwt (67,800 kg)	
1E	1	E49	SLM	2923	1923	16 LT 12 cwt (16,900 kg)	16 LT 13 cwt (16,900 kg)	66 LT 14 cwt (67,800 kg)	
1E	1	E50	SLM	2924	1923	16 LT 12 cwt (16,900 kg)	16 LT 13 cwt (16,900 kg)	66 LT 14 cwt (67,800 kg)	
1E	1	E51	SLM	2925	1923	16 LT 12 cwt (16,900 kg)	16 LT 13 cwt (16,900 kg)	66 LT 14 cwt (67,800 kg)	
1E	1	E52	SLM	2926	1923	16 LT 12 cwt (16,900 kg)	16 LT 13 cwt (16,900 kg)	66 LT 14 cwt (67,800 kg)	
1E	1	E53	SLM	2927	1923	16 LT 12 cwt (16,900 kg)	16 LT 13 cwt (16,900 kg)	66 LT 14 cwt (67,800 kg)	
1E	1	E54	SLM	2928	1923	16 LT 12 cwt (16,900 kg)	16 LT 13 cwt (16,900 kg)	66 LT 14 cwt (67,800 kg)	
1E	1	E55	SLM	2929	1923	16 LT 12 cwt (16,900 kg)	16 LT 13 cwt (16,900 kg)	66 LT 14 cwt (67,800 kg)	
1E	1	E56	SLM	2930	1923	16 LT 12 cwt (16,900 kg)	16 LT 13 cwt (16,900 kg)	66 LT 14 cwt (67,800 kg)	
1E	1	E57	SLM	2931	1923	16 LT 12 cwt (16,900 kg)	16 LT 13 cwt (16,900 kg)	66 LT 14 cwt (67,800 kg)	
1E	1	E58	SLM	2932	1923	16 LT 12 cwt (16,900 kg)	16 LT 13 cwt (16,900 kg)	66 LT 14 cwt (67,800 kg)	
1E	1	E59	SLM	2933	1923	16 LT 12 cwt (16,900 kg)	16 LT 13 cwt (16,900 kg)	66 LT 14 cwt (67,800 kg)	
1E	1	E60	SLM	2934	1923	16 LT 12 cwt (16,900 kg)	16 LT 13 cwt (16,900 kg)	66 LT 14 cwt (67,800 kg)	
1E	1	E61	Metrovick		1925	16 LT 12 cwt (16,900 kg)	16 LT 13 cwt (16,900 kg)	66 LT 14 cwt (67,800 kg)	
1E	1	E62	Metrovick		1925	16 LT 12 cwt (16,900 kg)	16 LT 13 cwt (16,900 kg)	66 LT 14 cwt (67,800 kg)	
1E	1	E63	Metrovick		1925	16 LT 12 cwt (16,900 kg)	16 LT 13 cwt (16,900 kg)	66 LT 14 cwt (67,800 kg)	
1E	1	E64	Metrovick		1925	16 LT 12 cwt (16,900 kg)	16 LT 13 cwt (16,900 kg)	66 LT 14 cwt (67,800 kg)	
1E	1	E65	Metrovick		1925	16 LT 12 cwt (16,900 kg)	16 LT 13 cwt (16,900 kg)	66 LT 14 cwt (67,800 kg)	
1E	1	E66	Metrovick		1925	16 LT 12 cwt (16,900 kg)	16 LT 13 cwt (16,900 kg)	66 LT 14 cwt (67,800 kg)	
1E	1	E67	Metrovick		1925	16 LT 12 cwt (16,900 kg)	16 LT 13 cwt (16,900 kg)	66 LT 14 cwt (67,800 kg)	
1E	1	E68	Metrovick		1925	16 LT 12 cwt (16,900 kg)	16 LT 13 cwt (16,900 kg)	66 LT 14 cwt (67,800 kg)	
1E	1	E69	Metrovick		1925	16 LT 12 cwt (16,900 kg)	16 LT 13 cwt (16,900 kg)	66 LT 14 cwt (67,800 kg)	
1E	1	E70	Metrovick		1925	16 LT 12 cwt (16,900 kg)	16 LT 13 cwt (16,900 kg)	66 LT 14 cwt (67,800 kg)	
1E	1	E71	Metrovick		1925	16 LT 12 cwt (16,900 kg)	16 LT 13 cwt (16,900 kg)	66 LT 14 cwt (67,800 kg)	
1E	1	E72	Metrovick		1925	16 LT 12 cwt (16,900 kg)	16 LT 13 cwt (16,900 kg)	66 LT 14 cwt (67,800 kg)	
1E	1	E73	Metrovick		1925	16 LT 12 cwt (16,900 kg)	16 LT 13 cwt (16,900 kg)	66 LT 14 cwt (67,800 kg)	
1E	1	E74	Metrovick		1925	16 LT 12 cwt (16,900 kg)	16 LT 13 cwt (16,900 kg)	66 LT 14 cwt (67,800 kg)	
1E	1	E75	Metrovick		1925	16 LT 12 cwt (16,900 kg)	16 LT 13 cwt (16,900 kg)	66 LT 14 cwt (67,800 kg)	
1E	1	E76	Metrovick		1925	16 LT 12 cwt (16,900 kg)	16 LT 13 cwt (16,900 kg)	66 LT 14 cwt (67,800 kg)	
1E	1	E77	Metrovick		1925	16 LT 12 cwt (16,900 kg)	16 LT 13 cwt (16,900 kg)	66 LT 14 cwt (67,800 kg)	
1E	1	E78	Metrovick		1925	16 LT 12 cwt (16,900 kg)	16 LT 13 cwt (16,900 kg)	66 LT 14 cwt (67,800 kg)	
1E	2	E79	Metrovick		1925–26	17 LT 4 cwt (17,500 kg)	17 LT 6 cwt (17,600 kg)	69 LT 0 cwt (70,100 kg)	
1E	2	E80	Metrovick		1925–26	17 LT 4 cwt (17,500 kg)	17 LT 6 cwt (17,600 kg)	69 LT 0 cwt (70,100 kg)	
1E	2	E81	Metrovick		1925–26	17 LT 4 cwt (17,500 kg)	17 LT 6 cwt (17,600 kg)	69 LT 0 cwt (70,100 kg)	
1E	2	E82	Metrovick		1925–26	17 LT 4 cwt (17,500 kg)	17 LT 6 cwt (17,600 kg)	69 LT 0 cwt (70,100 kg)	
1E	2	E83	Metrovick		1925–26	17 LT 4 cwt (17,500 kg)	17 LT 6 cwt (17,600 kg)	69 LT 0 cwt (70,100 kg)	
1E	2	E84	Metrovick		1925–26	17 LT 4 cwt (17,500 kg)	17 LT 6 cwt (17,600 kg)	69 LT 0 cwt (70,100 kg)	
1E	2	E85	Metrovick		1925–26	17 LT 4 cwt (17,500 kg)	17 LT 6 cwt (17,600 kg)	69 LT 0 cwt (70,100 kg)	
1E	2	E86	Metrovick		1925–26	17 LT 4 cwt (17,500 kg)	17 LT 6 cwt (17,600 kg)	69 LT 0 cwt (70,100 kg)	
1E	2	E87	Metrovick		1925–26	17 LT 4 cwt (17,500 kg)	17 LT 6 cwt (17,600 kg)	69 LT 0 cwt (70,100 kg)	
1E	2	E88	Metrovick		1925–26	17 LT 4 cwt (17,500 kg)	17 LT 6 cwt (17,600 kg)	69 LT 0 cwt (70,100 kg)	
1E	2	E89	Metrovick		1925–26	17 LT 4 cwt (17,500 kg)	17 LT 6 cwt (17,600 kg)	69 LT 0 cwt (70,100 kg)	
1E	2	E90	Metrovick		1925–26	17 LT 4 cwt (17,500 kg)	17 LT 6 cwt (17,600 kg)	69 LT 0 cwt (70,100 kg)	
1E	2	E91	Metrovick		1925–26	17 LT 4 cwt (17,500 kg)	17 LT 6 cwt (17,600 kg)	69 LT 0 cwt (70,100 kg)	
1E	2	E92	Metrovick		1925–26	17 LT 4 cwt (17,500 kg)	17 LT 6 cwt (17,600 kg)	69 LT 0 cwt (70,100 kg)	
1E	2	E93	Metrovick		1925–26	17 LT 4 cwt (17,500 kg)	17 LT 6 cwt (17,600 kg)	69 LT 0 cwt (70,100 kg)	
1E	2	E94	Metrovick		1925–26	17 LT 4 cwt (17,500 kg)	17 LT 6 cwt (17,600 kg)	69 LT 0 cwt (70,100 kg)	
1E	2	E95	Metrovick		1925–26	17 LT 4 cwt (17,500 kg)	17 LT 6 cwt (17,600 kg)	69 LT 0 cwt (70,100 kg)	
1E	3	E98	Metrovick		1936	16 LT 9 cwt (16,700 kg)	16 LT 9 cwt (16,700 kg)	65 LT 16 cwt (66,900 kg)	
1E	3	E99	Metrovick		1936	16 LT 9 cwt (16,700 kg)	16 LT 9 cwt (16,700 kg)	65 LT 16 cwt (66,900 kg)	
1E	3	E100	Metrovick		1936	16 LT 9 cwt (16,700 kg)	16 LT 9 cwt (16,700 kg)	65 LT 16 cwt (66,900 kg)	
1ES	3	E101	Metrovick		1936	16 LT 9 cwt (16,700 kg)	16 LT 9 cwt (16,700 kg)	65 LT 16 cwt (66,900 kg)	1ES
1E	3	E102	Metrovick		1936	16 LT 9 cwt (16,700 kg)	16 LT 9 cwt (16,700 kg)	65 LT 16 cwt (66,900 kg)	
1E	4	E103	Metrovick		1936	16 LT 9 cwt (16,700 kg)	16 LT 9 cwt (16,700 kg)	65 LT 16 cwt (66,900 kg)	
1ES	4	E104	Metrovick		1936	16 LT 9 cwt (16,700 kg)	16 LT 9 cwt (16,700 kg)	65 LT 16 cwt (66,900 kg)	1ES
1ES	4	E105	Metrovick		1936	16 LT 9 cwt (16,700 kg)	16 LT 9 cwt (16,700 kg)	65 LT 16 cwt (66,900 kg)	1ES
1ES	4	E106	Metrovick		1936	16 LT 9 cwt (16,700 kg)	16 LT 9 cwt (16,700 kg)	65 LT 16 cwt (66,900 kg)	1ES
1ES	4	E107	Metrovick		1936	16 LT 9 cwt (16,700 kg)	16 LT 9 cwt (16,700 kg)	65 LT 16 cwt (66,900 kg)	1ES
1ES	4	E108	Metrovick		1936	16 LT 9 cwt (16,700 kg)	16 LT 9 cwt (16,700 kg)	65 LT 16 cwt (66,900 kg)	1ES
1ES	4	E109	Metrovick		1936	16 LT 9 cwt (16,700 kg)	16 LT 9 cwt (16,700 kg)	65 LT 16 cwt (66,900 kg)	1ES
1ES	4	E110	Metrovick		1936	16 LT 9 cwt (16,700 kg)	16 LT 9 cwt (16,700 kg)	65 LT 16 cwt (66,900 kg)	1ES
1ES	4	E111	Metrovick		1936	16 LT 9 cwt (16,700 kg)	16 LT 9 cwt (16,700 kg)	65 LT 16 cwt (66,900 kg)	1ES
1ES	4	E112	Metrovick		1936	16 LT 9 cwt (16,700 kg)	16 LT 9 cwt (16,700 kg)	65 LT 16 cwt (66,900 kg)	1ES
1ES	4	E113	Metrovick		1936	16 LT 9 cwt (16,700 kg)	16 LT 9 cwt (16,700 kg)	65 LT 16 cwt (66,900 kg)	1ES
1ES	4	E114	Metrovick		1936	16 LT 9 cwt (16,700 kg)	16 LT 9 cwt (16,700 kg)	65 LT 16 cwt (66,900 kg)	ES E525
1ES	4	E115	Metrovick		1936	16 LT 9 cwt (16,700 kg)	16 LT 9 cwt (16,700 kg)	65 LT 16 cwt (66,900 kg)	1ES
1ES	4	E116	Metrovick		1936	16 LT 9 cwt (16,700 kg)	16 LT 9 cwt (16,700 kg)	65 LT 16 cwt (66,900 kg)	1ES
1ES	4	E117	Metrovick		1936	16 LT 9 cwt (16,700 kg)	16 LT 9 cwt (16,700 kg)	65 LT 16 cwt (66,900 kg)	1ES
1ES	4	E118	Metrovick		1936	16 LT 9 cwt (16,700 kg)	16 LT 9 cwt (16,700 kg)	65 LT 16 cwt (66,900 kg)	1ES
1ES	4	E119	Metrovick		1936	16 LT 9 cwt (16,700 kg)	16 LT 9 cwt (16,700 kg)	65 LT 16 cwt (66,900 kg)	1ES
1ES	4	E120	Metrovick		1936	16 LT 9 cwt (16,700 kg)	16 LT 9 cwt (16,700 kg)	65 LT 16 cwt (66,900 kg)	1ES
1ES	4	E121	Metrovick		1936	16 LT 12 cwt (16,900 kg)	16 LT 12 cwt (16,900 kg)	66 LT 8 cwt (67,500 kg)	1ES
1ES	4	E122	Metrovick		1936	16 LT 12 cwt (16,900 kg)	16 LT 12 cwt (16,900 kg)	66 LT 8 cwt (67,500 kg)	1ES
1ES	5	E139	SLM	3655	1938	16 LT 13 cwt (16,900 kg)	16 LT 13 cwt (16,900 kg)	66 LT 12 cwt (67,700 kg)	1ES
1ES	5	E140	SLM	3656	1938	16 LT 13 cwt (16,900 kg)	16 LT 13 cwt (16,900 kg)	66 LT 12 cwt (67,700 kg)	1ES
1ES	5	E141	SLM	3657	1938	16 LT 13 cwt (16,900 kg)	16 LT 13 cwt (16,900 kg)	66 LT 12 cwt (67,700 kg)	1ES
1ES	5	E142	SLM	3658	1938	16 LT 13 cwt (16,900 kg)	16 LT 13 cwt (16,900 kg)	66 LT 12 cwt (67,700 kg)	1ES
1ES	5	E143	SLM	3659	1938	16 LT 13 cwt (16,900 kg)	16 LT 13 cwt (16,900 kg)	66 LT 12 cwt (67,700 kg)	1ES
1ES	5	E144	SLM	3660	1938	16 LT 13 cwt (16,900 kg)	16 LT 13 cwt (16,900 kg)	66 LT 12 cwt (67,700 kg)	1ES
1ES	5	E145	SLM	3661	1938	16 LT 13 cwt (16,900 kg)	16 LT 13 cwt (16,900 kg)	66 LT 12 cwt (67,700 kg)	1ES
1ES	5	E146	SLM	3662	1938	16 LT 13 cwt (16,900 kg)	16 LT 13 cwt (16,900 kg)	66 LT 12 cwt (67,700 kg)	ES E526
1ES	5	E147	SLM	3663	1938	16 LT 13 cwt (16,900 kg)	16 LT 13 cwt (16,900 kg)	66 LT 12 cwt (67,700 kg)	1ES
1ES	5	E148	SLM	3664	1938	16 LT 13 cwt (16,900 kg)	16 LT 13 cwt (16,900 kg)	66 LT 12 cwt (67,700 kg)	1ES
1ES	5	E149	SLM	3665	1938	16 LT 13 cwt (16,900 kg)	16 LT 13 cwt (16,900 kg)	66 LT 12 cwt (67,700 kg)	1ES
1ES	5	E150	SLM	3666	1938	16 LT 13 cwt (16,900 kg)	16 LT 13 cwt (16,900 kg)	66 LT 12 cwt (67,700 kg)	1ES
1ES	5	E151	SLM	3667	1938	16 LT 13 cwt (16,900 kg)	16 LT 13 cwt (16,900 kg)	66 LT 12 cwt (67,700 kg)	1ES
1E	5	E152	SLM	3668	1938	16 LT 13 cwt (16,900 kg)	16 LT 13 cwt (16,900 kg)	66 LT 12 cwt (67,700 kg)	
1ES	5	E153	SLM	3669	1938	16 LT 13 cwt (16,900 kg)	16 LT 13 cwt (16,900 kg)	66 LT 12 cwt (67,700 kg)	1ES
1E	5	E154	SLM	3670	1938	16 LT 13 cwt (16,900 kg)	16 LT 13 cwt (16,900 kg)	66 LT 12 cwt (67,700 kg)	
1E	5	E155	SLM	3671	1938	16 LT 13 cwt (16,900 kg)	16 LT 13 cwt (16,900 kg)	66 LT 12 cwt (67,700 kg)	
1E	5	E156	SLM	3672	1938	16 LT 13 cwt (16,900 kg)	16 LT 13 cwt (16,900 kg)	66 LT 12 cwt (67,700 kg)	
1ES	5	E157	SLM	3673	1938	16 LT 13 cwt (16,900 kg)	16 LT 13 cwt (16,900 kg)	66 LT 12 cwt (67,700 kg)	1ES
1E	5	E158	SLM	3674	1938	16 LT 13 cwt (16,900 kg)	16 LT 13 cwt (16,900 kg)	66 LT 12 cwt (67,700 kg)	
1E	5	E159	SLM	3675	1938	16 LT 13 cwt (16,900 kg)	16 LT 13 cwt (16,900 kg)	66 LT 12 cwt (67,700 kg)	
1E	5	E160	SLM	3676	1938	16 LT 13 cwt (16,900 kg)	16 LT 13 cwt (16,900 kg)	66 LT 12 cwt (67,700 kg)	
1E	6	E161	Werkspoor	747	1938	16 LT 13 cwt (16,900 kg)	16 LT 13 cwt (16,900 kg)	66 LT 12 cwt (67,700 kg)	
1E	6	E162	Werkspoor	748	1938	16 LT 13 cwt (16,900 kg)	16 LT 13 cwt (16,900 kg)	66 LT 12 cwt (67,700 kg)	
1E	6	E163	Werkspoor	749	1938	16 LT 13 cwt (16,900 kg)	16 LT 13 cwt (16,900 kg)	66 LT 12 cwt (67,700 kg)	
1E	6	E164	Werkspoor	750	1938	16 LT 13 cwt (16,900 kg)	16 LT 13 cwt (16,900 kg)	66 LT 12 cwt (67,700 kg)	
1E	6	E165	Werkspoor	751	1938	16 LT 13 cwt (16,900 kg)	16 LT 13 cwt (16,900 kg)	66 LT 12 cwt (67,700 kg)	
1E	6	E166	Werkspoor	752	1938	16 LT 13 cwt (16,900 kg)	16 LT 13 cwt (16,900 kg)	66 LT 12 cwt (67,700 kg)	
1E	6	E167	Werkspoor	753	1938	16 LT 13 cwt (16,900 kg)	16 LT 13 cwt (16,900 kg)	66 LT 12 cwt (67,700 kg)	
1E	6	E168	Werkspoor	754	1938	16 LT 13 cwt (16,900 kg)	16 LT 13 cwt (16,900 kg)	66 LT 12 cwt (67,700 kg)	
1E	6	E169	Werkspoor	755	1938	16 LT 13 cwt (16,900 kg)	16 LT 13 cwt (16,900 kg)	66 LT 12 cwt (67,700 kg)	
1E	6	E170	Werkspoor	756	1938	16 LT 13 cwt (16,900 kg)	16 LT 13 cwt (16,900 kg)	66 LT 12 cwt (67,700 kg)	
1E	6	E171	Werkspoor	757	1938	16 LT 13 cwt (16,900 kg)	16 LT 13 cwt (16,900 kg)	66 LT 12 cwt (67,700 kg)	
1E	6	E172	Werkspoor	758	1938	16 LT 13 cwt (16,900 kg)	16 LT 13 cwt (16,900 kg)	66 LT 12 cwt (67,700 kg)	
1E	6	E173	Werkspoor	759	1938	16 LT 13 cwt (16,900 kg)	16 LT 13 cwt (16,900 kg)	66 LT 12 cwt (67,700 kg)	
1E	6	E174	Werkspoor	760	1938	16 LT 13 cwt (16,900 kg)	16 LT 13 cwt (16,900 kg)	66 LT 12 cwt (67,700 kg)	
1E	6	E175	Werkspoor	761	1938	16 LT 13 cwt (16,900 kg)	16 LT 13 cwt (16,900 kg)	66 LT 12 cwt (67,700 kg)	
1E	6	E176	Werkspoor	762	1938	16 LT 13 cwt (16,900 kg)	16 LT 13 cwt (16,900 kg)	66 LT 12 cwt (67,700 kg)	
1E	6	E177	Werkspoor	763	1938	16 LT 13 cwt (16,900 kg)	16 LT 13 cwt (16,900 kg)	66 LT 12 cwt (67,700 kg)	
1E	6	E178	Werkspoor	764	1938	16 LT 13 cwt (16,900 kg)	16 LT 13 cwt (16,900 kg)	66 LT 12 cwt (67,700 kg)	
1E	6	E179	Werkspoor	765	1938	16 LT 13 cwt (16,900 kg)	16 LT 13 cwt (16,900 kg)	66 LT 12 cwt (67,700 kg)	
1E	6	E180	Werkspoor	766	1938	16 LT 13 cwt (16,900 kg)	16 LT 13 cwt (16,900 kg)	66 LT 12 cwt (67,700 kg)	
1E	7	E181	RSH	7181	1944				
1E	7	E182	RSH	7182	1944				
1E	7	E183	RSH	7183	1944				
1E	7	E184	RSH	7184	1944				
1E	7	E185	RSH	7185	1944				
1E	7	E186	RSH	7186	1944				
1E	7	E187	RSH	7187	1944				
1E	7	E188	RSH	7188	1944				
1E	7	E189	RSH	7189	1944				
1E	7	E190	RSH	7190	1944				

== Illustration ==
The main picture shows a Class 1ES locomotive with its enlarged cab and slanted upper edge front windows, while the following pictures illustrate unmodified locomotives.

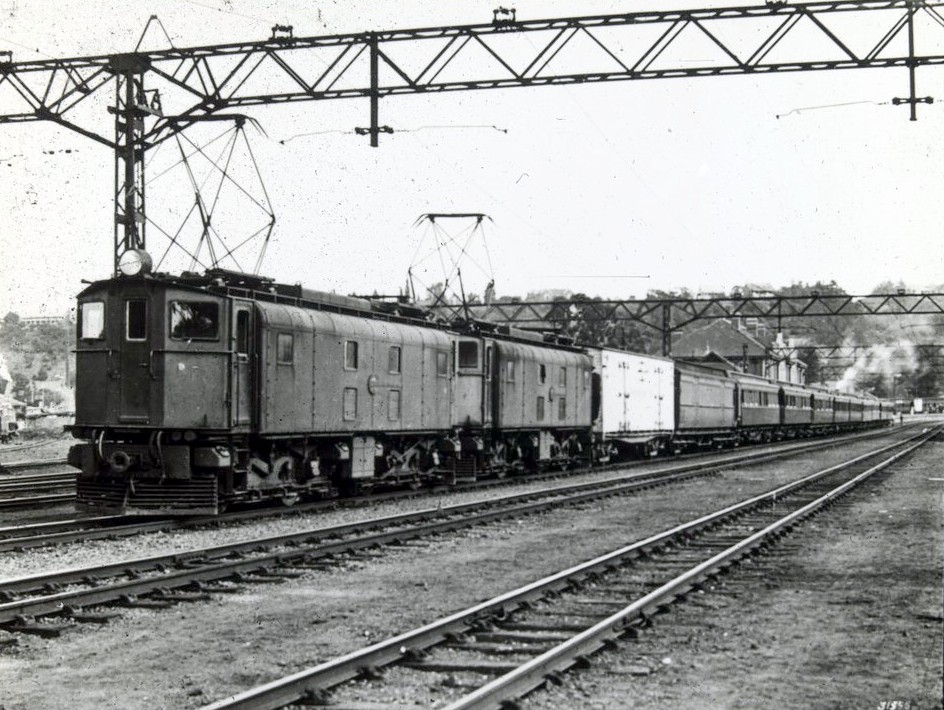
Class 1E double-heading a passenger train in Natal, c. 1930

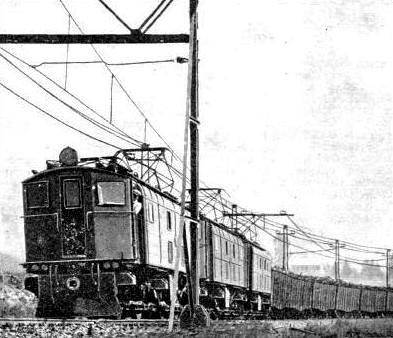
Class 1E triple-heading a coal train near Glencoe, c. 1945

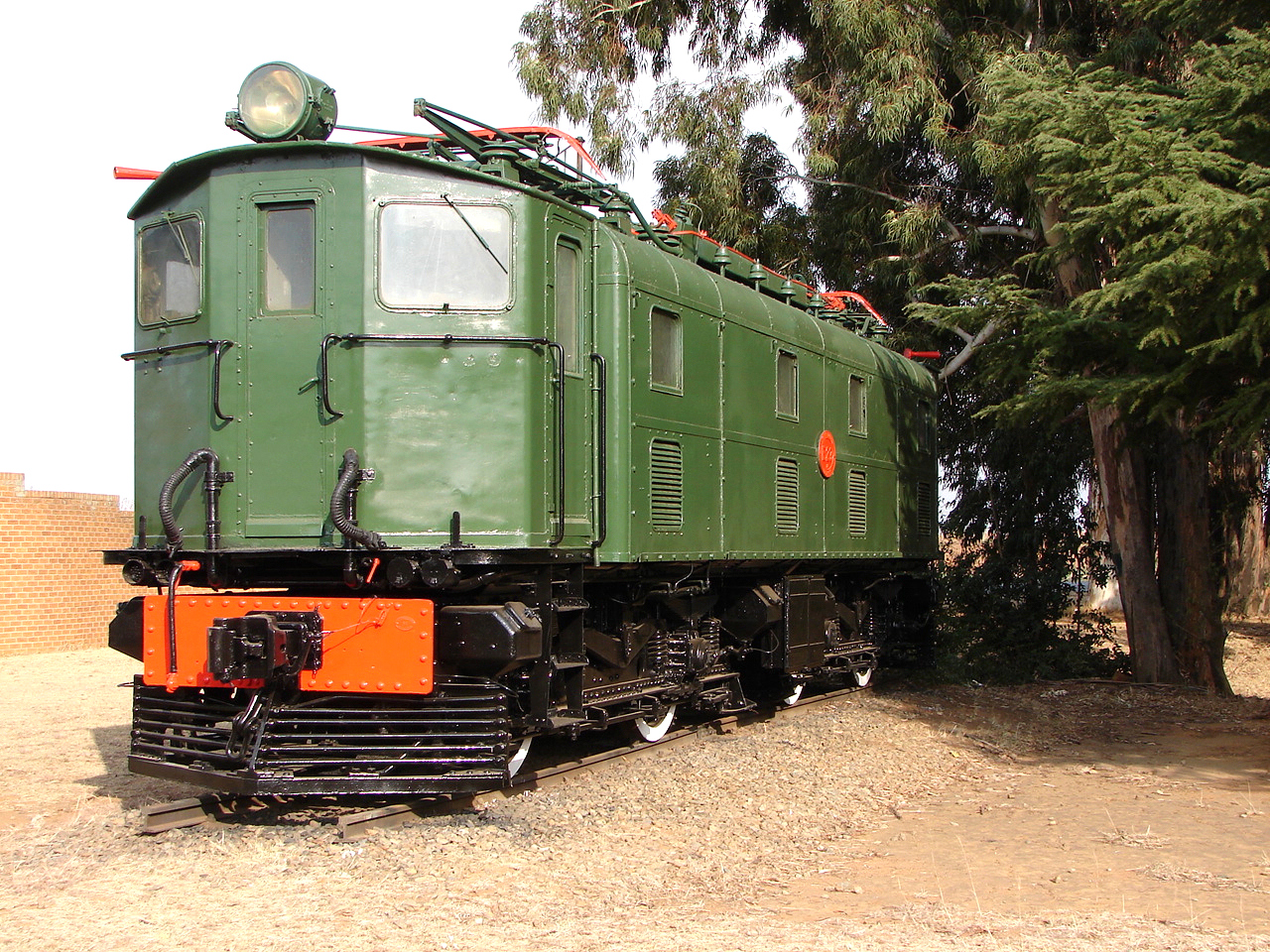
No. E23 plinthed at Union Carriage & Wagon, 24 September 2009

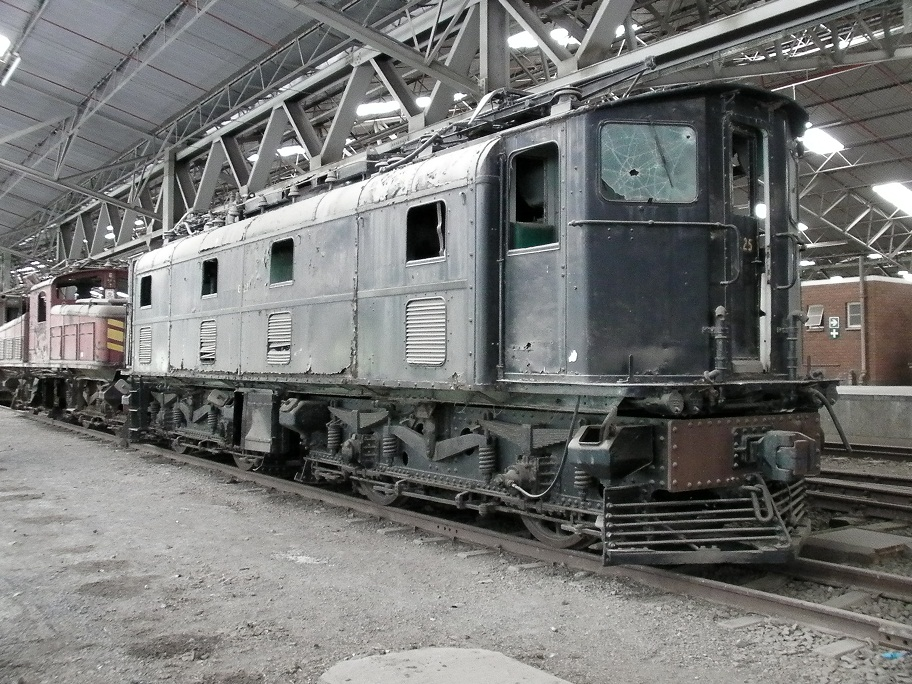
No. E25 in black, at Danskraal, Ladysmith, 5 December 2010
