= South African Class ES1 =

Class of 1 South African battery-electric locomotive

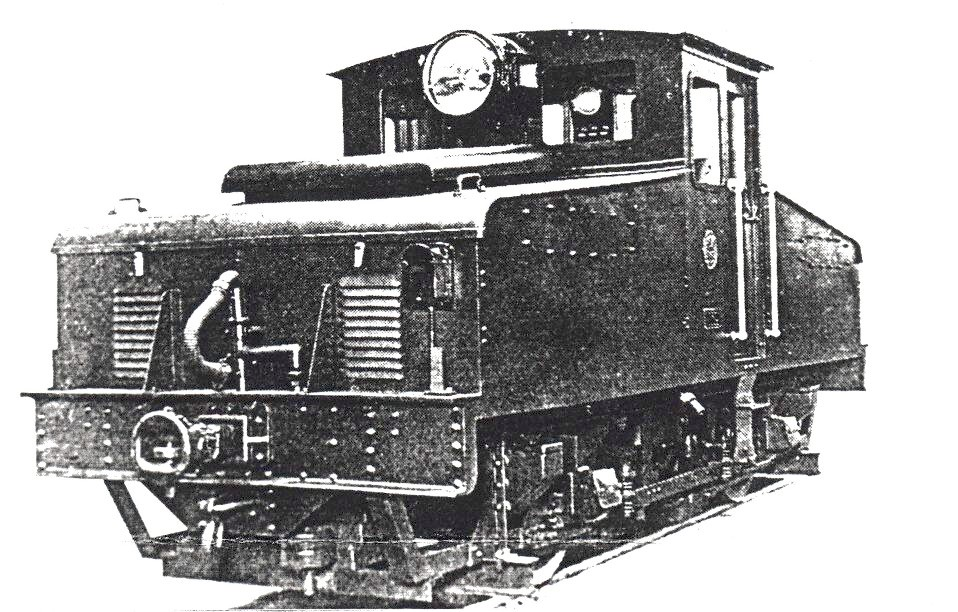
- Class ES1 shunting locomotive, c. 1930
Type and origin
- Power type: Electric
- Designer: English Electric
- Builder: English Electric
- Model: SAR ES1
- Build date: 1924
Specifications
- Configuration
  - Whyte: 4wBE
  - AAR: B
  - UIC: Bo
  - Commonwealth: Bo
- Gauge: 3 ft 6 in (1,067 mm) Cape gauge
- Wheel diameter: 38 in (965 mm)
- Wheelbase: 10 ft 5 in (3,175 mm)
- Length
  - Over couplers: 24 ft 5 in (7,442 mm)
  - Over beams: 22 ft (6,706 mm)
- Height: 10 ft (3,048 mm)
- Axle load: 12 LT 3 cwt (12,340 kg)
- Loco weight: 24 LT 5 cwt (24,640 kg)
- Electric system/s: 235 V 196 A, 208 cell battery
- Current pickup(s): N/A
- Traction motors: Two
- Gear ratio: 5.4:1
- Couplers: Johnston link-and-pin AAR knuckle (1930s)
Performance figures
- Power output: 50 hp (37 kW)
- Tractive effort
  - 1 hour: 8,500 lbf (38 kN)
Career
- Operators: South African Railways; ESKOM
- Class: Class ES1
- Number in class: 1
- Numbers: E123, renumbered E502
- Nicknames: Queen Mary
- Delivered: 1924
- First run: 1924
- Withdrawn: 1978

The South African Railways Class ES1 of 1924 was an electric locomotive.

In 1924, the South African Railways placed a single Class ES1 battery-powered shunting locomotive in service at the construction site of the Colenso power station. In 1927, the power station and the locomotive were sold to the Electricity Supply Commission and in 1937 the locomotive was purchased back for use at the Daimana (Danskraal) locomotive depot.

== Manufacturer ==
During the electrification of the Glencoe to Pietermaritzburg section of the Natal mainline, a mountainous single-track line which carried heavy mineral traffic towards the port of Durban on an alignment with severe gradients and tight curves, the Colenso power station was built by the South African Railways (SAR) to supply the power for this line.

A single battery-powered electric shunting locomotive, the only battery-powered locomotive to ever see service on the SAR, was purchased from English Electric in 1924 for use at the power station construction site.

== Characteristics ==
The centre-cab locomotive had a Bo wheel arrangement, the two axles being driven by two 37 kilowatts (50 horsepower) traction motors, operating at 235 volts and powered by a 208 cell nickel-iron alkali type battery with a 435 amp-hour capacity.

== Service ==
The locomotive remained in service at the Colenso power station after 1927, when the power station and all its equipment, including the battery locomotive, was sold to the Electricity Supply Commission (ESKOM), the state-owned South African national power corporation.

In 1937, the locomotive was purchased back from ESKOM by the SAR, designated Class ES1 with unit number E123 and stationed at the Daimana (Danskraal) locomotive depot at Ladysmith where it was used as shop shunting engine to move cold steam locomotives and dead electric units. Nicknamed Queen Mary, it was later renumbered to E502. It remained in service at Danskraal until it was withdrawn from service in 1978.
