= DS class =

DS class or Class DS may refer to:

- NZR DS class, diesel-mechanical/hydraulic shunting locomotives
- South African Class DS, diesel-electric shunting locomotives
