= South African Class ES =

Type of electric locomotive

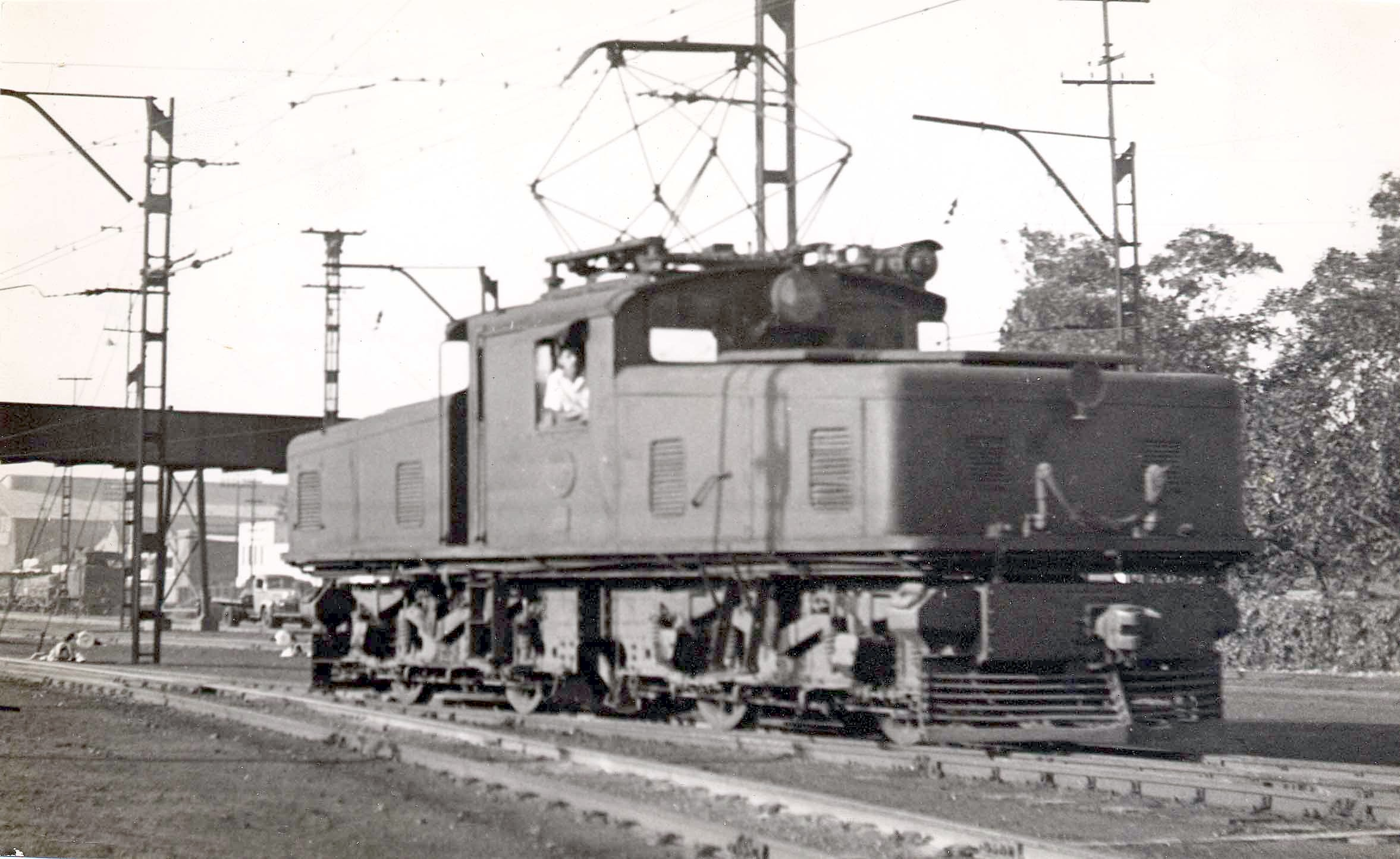
- Class ES shunting locomotive, c. 1936
Type and origin
- ♠ Series 1 & 2 – ♥ Series 3 & 4
- Power type: Electric
- Designer: South African Railways (A.G. Watson)
- Builder: South African Railways; Werkspoor
- Serial number: Werkspoor 737-746, 913-924 & 1053-1054, SLM 3662
- Model: SAR ES
- Build date: 1936–1964
- Total produced: 28
Specifications
- Configuration
  - AAR: B-B
  - UIC: Bo+Bo
  - Commonwealth: Bo+Bo
- Gauge: 3 ft 6 in (1,067 mm) Cape gauge
- Wheel diameter: 1,219 mm (48.0 in)
- Minimum curve: 91.45 m (300 ft)
- Wheelbase: 9,423 mm (30 ft 11.0 in)
  - Bogie: 2,819 mm (9 ft 3.0 in)
- Pivot centres: 6,604 mm (21 ft 8.0 in)
- Length
  - Over couplers: 13,310 mm (43 ft 8.0 in)
- Width: 2,800 mm (9 ft 2.2 in)
- Height
  - Pantograph: ♠ 3,859 mm (12 ft 7.9 in) ♥ 4,026 mm (13 ft 2.5 in)
  - Body height: ♠ 3,478 mm (11 ft 4.9 in) ♥ 3,618 mm (11 ft 10.4 in)
- Axle load: 17,018 kg (37,518 lb)
- Loco weight: 68,075 kg (150,080 lb)
- Electric system/s: 3 kV DC catenary
- Current pickup: Pantograph
- Traction motors: Four MV 182R
  - Rating 1 hour: 224 kW (300 hp)
- Gear ratio: 17:75
- Train brakes: Air & Vacuum
- Couplers: AAR knuckle
Performance figures
- Maximum speed: 40 km/h (25 mph)
- Power output: 896 kW (1,202 hp)
- Tractive effort
  - Starting: 176 kN (40,000 lbf)
  - 1 hour: 94 kN (21,000 lbf)
  - Continuous: 73 kN (16,000 lbf)
Career
- Operators: South African Railways; Driefontein GM
- Class: Class ES
- Number in class: 28
- Numbers: SAR E500-E501 (ex E96-E97), E503-E512 (ex E124-E133), E515-E526, Driefontein 1-4
- Nicknames: Studebaker
- Delivered: 1936–1964
- First run: 1936
- Withdrawn: c. 1983

The South African Railways Class ES of 1936 was an electric locomotive.

In 1936, the South African Railways built two Class ES centre-cab electric shunting locomotives with a Bo+Bo wheel arrangement, based on the Class 1E mainline electric locomotive. Between then and 1964, more were acquired until a total of 24 Class ES locomotives were eventually in service. Four more were built new for industry in 1952 and 1957.

The Class ES was the fourth locomotive type to be designed and built in South Africa, after the Natal Government Railways 4-6-2TT Havelock of 1888, the Class 2C of 1910 and the Class 20 of 1935.

== Design ==
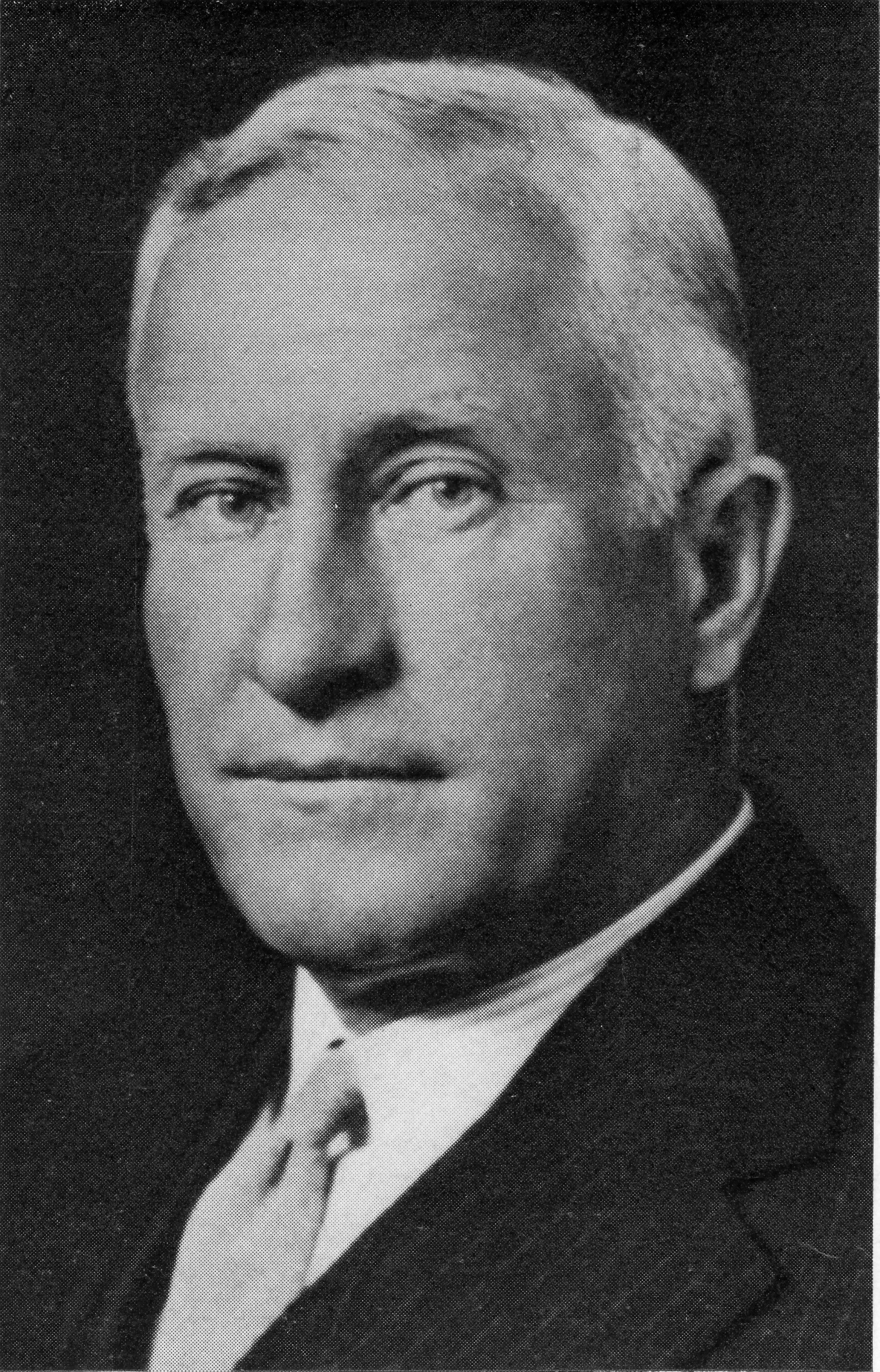
A.G. Watson

During 1935, it was decided to replace steam shunting locomotives with electric shunting units at Daimana (Danskraal) in Ladysmith. A design for a centre-cab electric shunting locomotive, based on the Class 1E mainline locomotive which was originally designed by Metropolitan-Vickers (Metrovick), was prepared by A.G. Watson, Chief Mechanical Engineer of the South African Railways (SAR) from 1929 to 1936, in collaboration with the SAR Electrical Department.

== Manufacturers ==
The first two Class ES locomotives were built new in Pietermaritzburg, where the bodywork was constructed in the SAR workshops. Two sets of spare Class 1E power bogies, complete with traction motors and gearing, were used. The wiring, control equipment and auxiliary machinery were installed at Daimana. These two units were initially numbered E96 and E97, but they were later renumbered to E500 and E501. They entered service at Daimana in 1936 as South Africa's first purpose-built electric shunting locomotives.

Even though it was not wholly a South African product with its imported Class 1E spare parts, the Class ES was the fourth recorded instance of locomotives designed and constructed in South African workshops, after the Natal Government Railways' engine Havelock of 1888, the Class 2C of 1910 and the Class 20 of 1935.

Over the next 28 years, more of these locomotives were built and by 1964 24 Class ES locomotives had been placed in service by the SAR. As can be expected in a locomotive type which was built by different manufacturers over a period of almost three decades, there are differences in appearance between locomotives.

Two batches of ten were built by the Nederlandsche Fabriek van Werktuigen en Spoorwegmaterieel (Werkspoor).

- Series 2, numbers E124 to E133, entered service in 1938 and were later renumbered in the range from E503 to E512.
- Series 3, numbers E515 to E524, entered service in 1953.

Series 4, numbers E525 and E526, the last two, were rebuilt from Class 1E locomotives in the SAR shops in 1964.

- No. E525 was rebuilt from Class 1E, Series 4 no. E114, originally built by Metrovick.
- No. E526 was rebuilt from Class 1E, Series 5 no. E146, originally built by Swiss Locomotive and Machine Works (SLM).

In 1952, two Class ES locomotives were built new for the Driefontein Consolidated Gold Mine (Dries) by Werkspoor, numbered 1 and 2. Another two were delivered new to the mine in 1957, numbered 3 and 4, also built by Werkspoor.

== Characteristics ==
The locomotive body had three main sections. For the convenience of the driver and to afford him better outside vision, the cab was placed in the middle of the body, with the hoods of the machinery compartments tapering downwards from the cab. The "S" in the locomotive's class designation identifies it as a shunting locomotive, designed for and usually limited to yard work.

With a maximum safe speed of 40 kilometres per hour (25 miles per hour), they ran on an overhead power supply of 3 kV DC. Their traction motors, connected in series on each bogie, operated on 1.5 kV DC.

== Service ==
Although the class ES was initially largely confined to service in Natal, members of the class became quite common working on the Western Transvaal System in later years, mainly being employed around the Witwatersrand. Beginning in 1983, they were eventually replaced by the Class 8E, also a centre-cab shunting locomotive.

The locomotives were known by enginemen as Studebakers since the two long hoods either side of the cab were likened to a 1947 Studebaker Commander Business Coupe.

No. E511 is stored at Millsite Locomotive Depot in Krugersdorp awaiting possible restoration.

== Works numbers ==
The builders, works numbers, years built and renumbering of the Class ES are listed in the table below.

Class ES locomotive
Series	Builder	Works no.	Year	Old no.	New no.	Notes
1	SAR		1935	E96	E500	
1	SAR		1935	E97	E501	
2	Werkspoor	737	1937	E124	E503	
2	Werkspoor	738	1937	E125	E504	
2	Werkspoor	739	1937	E126	E505	
2	Werkspoor	740	1937	E127	E506	
2	Werkspoor	741	1937	E128	E507	
2	Werkspoor	742	1937	E129	E508	
2	Werkspoor	743	1937	E130	E509	
2	Werkspoor	744	1937	E131	E510	
2	Werkspoor	745	1937	E132	E511	
2	Werkspoor	746	1937	E133	E512	
3	Werkspoor	913	1951		E515	
3	Werkspoor	914	1951		E516	
3	Werkspoor	915	1951		E517	
3	Werkspoor	916	1951		E518	
3	Werkspoor	917	1951		E519	
3	Werkspoor	918	1951		E520	
3	Werkspoor	919	1951		E521	
3	Werkspoor	920	1951		E522	
3	Werkspoor	921	1951		E523	
3	Werkspoor	922	1951		E524	
3	Werkspoor	923	1952		1	Dries GM
3	Werkspoor	924	1952		2	Dries GM
3	Werkspoor	1053	1957		3	Dries GM
3	Werkspoor	1054	1957		4	Dries GM
4	Metrovick		1964	E114	E525	1E rebuilt
4	SLM	3662	1964	E146	E526	1E rebuilt

== Illustration ==
The main picture shows one of the first two Class ES locomotives to be built, c. 1936. Until the 1960s, they had a bottle green livery with red buffer beams. Some of the liveries which were applied to Class ES locomotives are illustrated below.

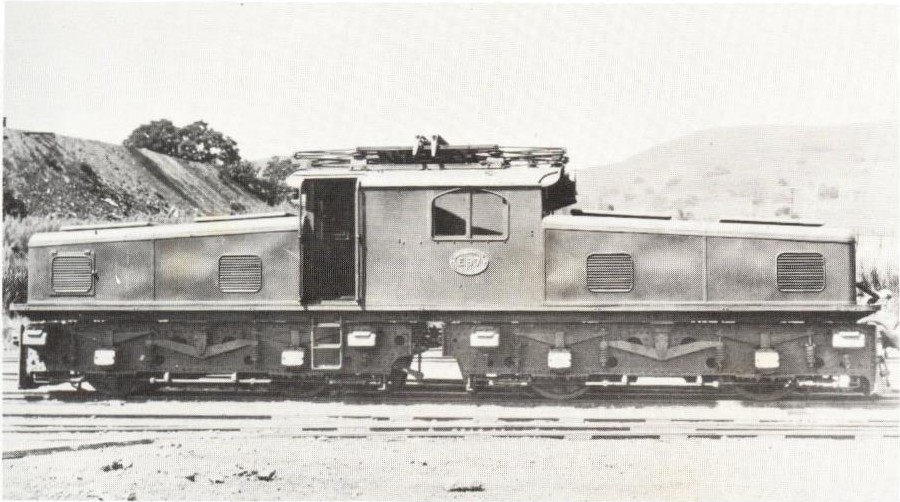
Series 1 no. E97, later renumbered to no. E501, c. 1936

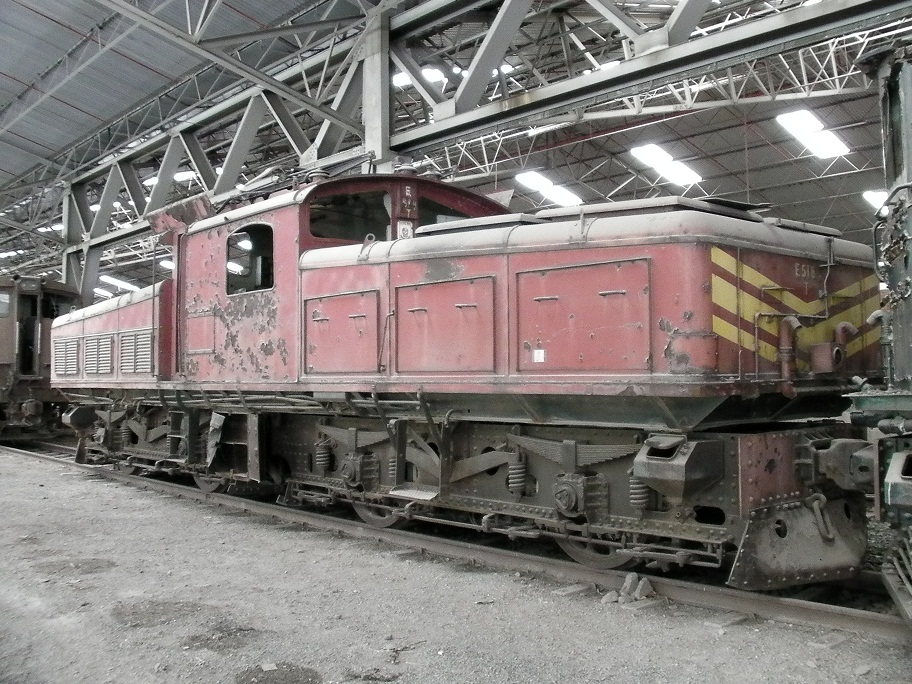
Series 3 no. E518 at Danskraal, 5 December 2010

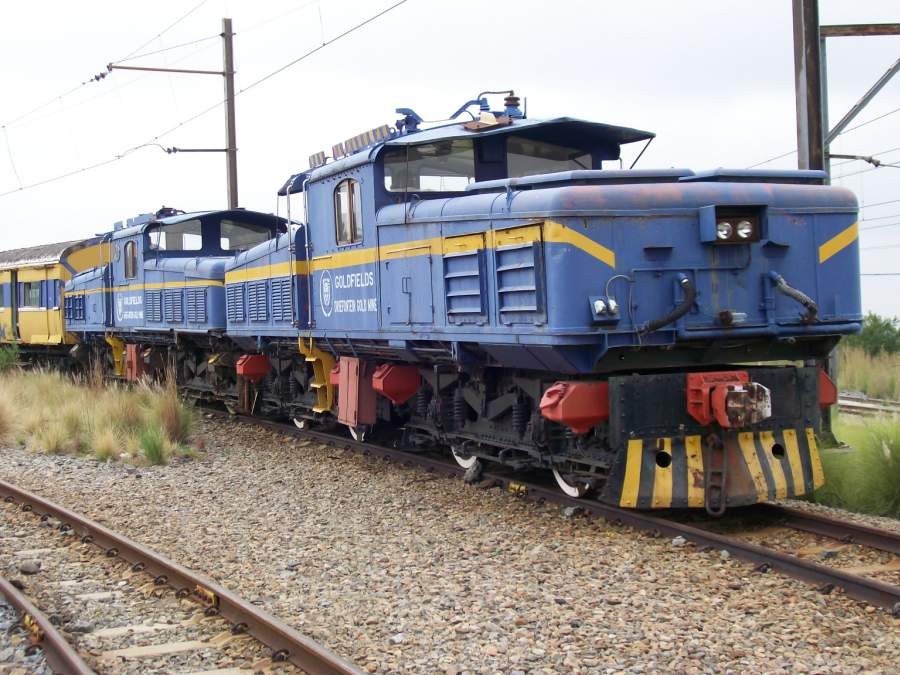
Driefontein Consolidated Ltd. no. 1, 21 January 2009

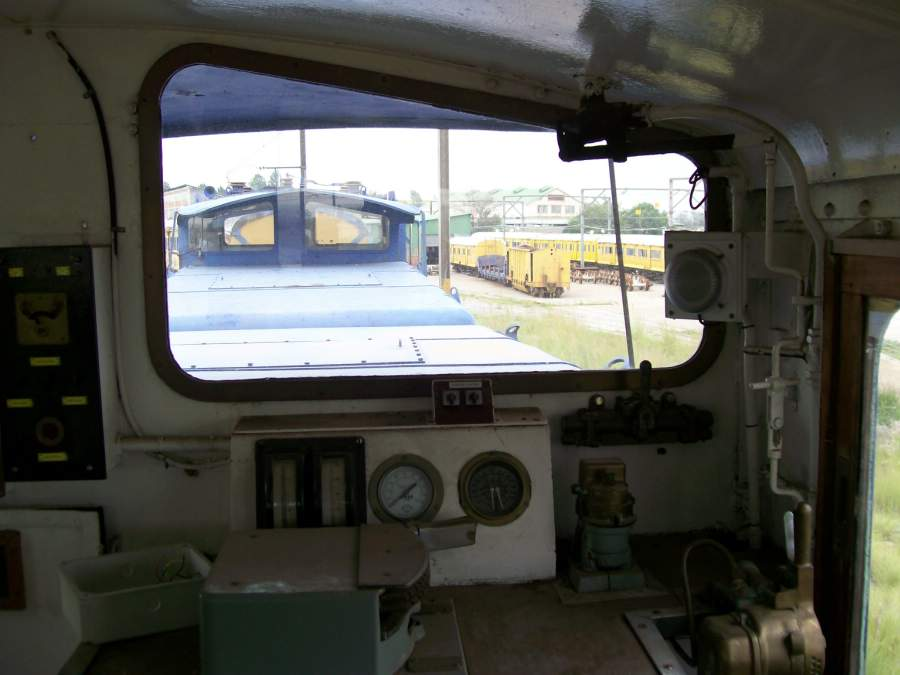
Cab interior of Driefontein no. 1
