= Colenso =

Colenso may refer to:

== People ==
- Elizabeth Colenso (1821 – 1904), missionary, teacher, translator, wife of William Colenso
- Frances Colenso (1849 – 1887), historian, daughter of John Colenso
- Harriette Colenso (1847 – 1932), Anglican missionary, daughter of John Colenso
- John Colenso (1814 – 1883), first Anglican bishop of Natal, mathematician, theologian, Biblical scholar and social activist
- William Colenso (1811 – 1899), missionary, botanist and politician in New Zealand

== Other ==
- Battle of Colenso, 1899, during the Second Boer War
- Colenso, KwaZulu-Natal, town in eastern South Africa
  - Colenso Power Station
- Colenso Parade, alternative rock band from Belfast, Northern Ireland
