= South African Class 3E =

Type of electric locomotive

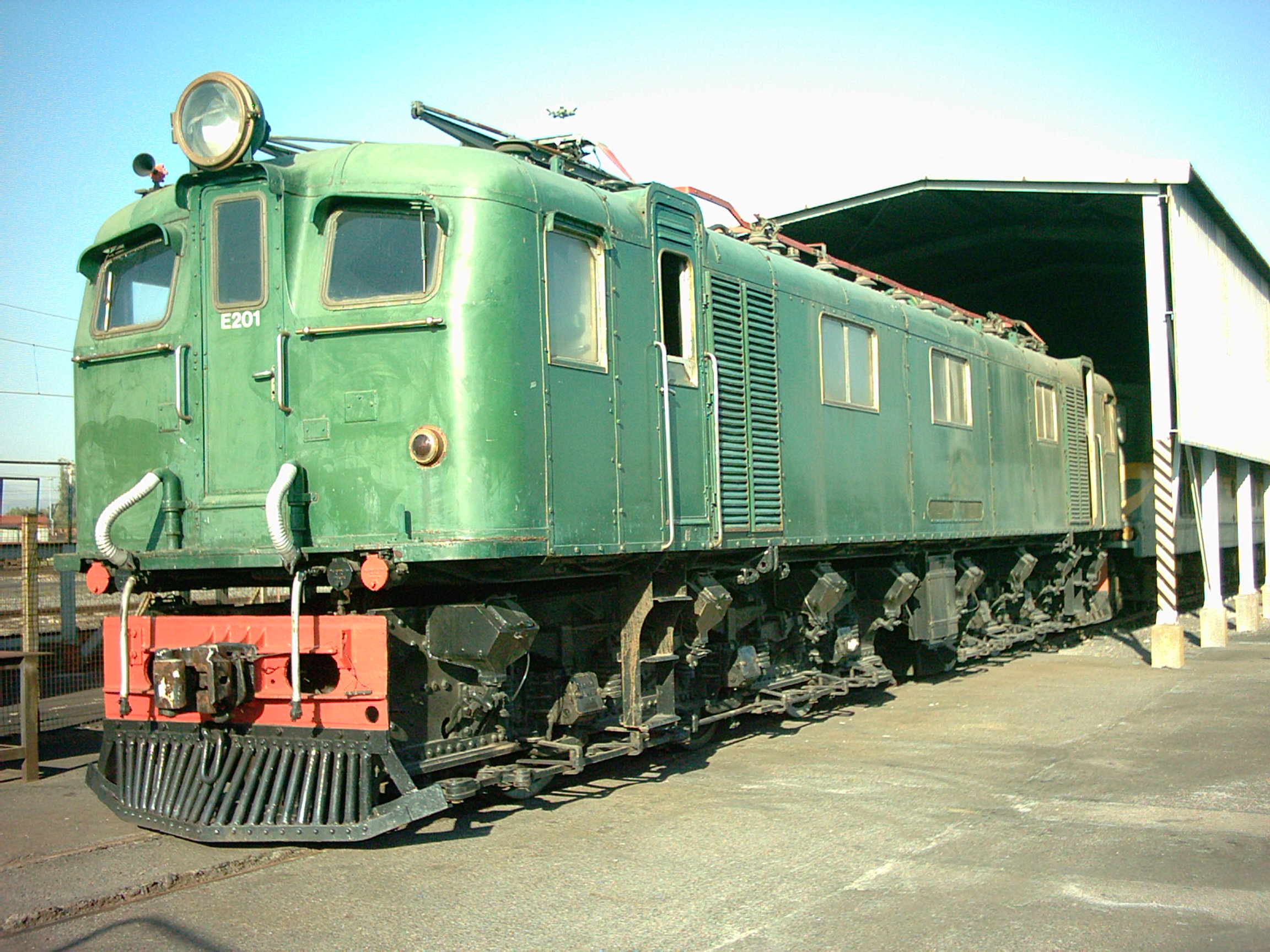
- No. E201 at Bellville Loco, Cape Town, 29 April 2004
Type and origin
- Power type: Electric
- Designer: Metropolitan-Vickers
- Builder: Robert Stephenson and Hawthorns
- Serial number: RSH 7215-7242
- Model: Metrovick 3E
- Build date: 1947
- Total produced: 28
Specifications
- Configuration
  - AAR: C-C
  - UIC: Co′Co′
  - Commonwealth: Co+Co
- Gauge: 3 ft 6 in (1,067 mm) Cape gauge
- Wheel diameter: 1,219 mm (48.0 in)
- Wheelbase: 12,801 mm (42 ft 0 in)
  - Axle spacing (Asymmetrical): 1-2: 2,286 mm (7 ft 6 in); 2-3: 1,981 mm (6 ft 6 in)
  - Bogie: 4,267 mm (14 ft 0 in)
- Pivot centres: 9,144 mm (30 ft 0 in)
- Panto shoes: 10,973 mm (36 ft 0 in)
- Length
  - Over couplers: 17,199 mm (56 ft 5 1/8 in)
- Height
  - Pantograph: 4,089 mm (13 ft 5 in)
  - Body height: 3,658 mm (12 ft 0 in)
- Axle load: Axles 1 & 3: 18,796.75 kg (41,439.7 lb); Axle 2: 19,305 kg (42,560 lb)
- Adhesive weight: 113,797 kg (250,879 lb)
- Loco weight: 113,797 kg (250,879 lb)
- Electric system/s: 3 kV DC catenary
- Current pickup(s): Pantographs
- Traction motors: Six MV 187
  - Rating 1 hour: 336 kW (451 hp)
  - Continuous: 284 kW (381 hp)
- Gear ratio: 23:71
- Train brakes: Air & Vacuum
- Couplers: AAR knuckle
Performance figures
- Maximum speed: 105 km/h (65 mph)
- Power output
  - 1 hour: 2,016 kW (2,704 hp)
  - Continuous: 1,704 kW (2,285 hp)
- Tractive effort
  - Starting: 204 kN (46,000 lbf)
  - 1 hour: 151 kN (34,000 lbf)
  - Continuous: 119 kN (27,000 lbf)
Career
- Operators: South African Railways
- Class: Class 3E
- Number in class: 28
- Numbers: E191-E218
- Delivered: 1947-1948
- First run: 1947

The South African Railways Class 3E of 1947 was an electric locomotive.

In 1947 and 1948, the South African Railways placed twenty-eight Class 3E electric locomotives with a Co+Co wheel arrangement in mainline service.

== Manufacturer ==
The South African Railways (SAR) placed orders for the design and construction of the 3 kV DC Class 3E electric locomotive with Metropolitan-Vickers (Metrovick) in 1944. Although the locomotive was designed by Metrovick who also supplied the electrical equipment, its construction was subcontracted to Robert Stephenson and Hawthorns. Twenty-eight locomotives were delivered and placed in service in 1947 and 1948, numbered in the range from E191 to E218.

== Characteristics ==
These dual cab locomotives have three windows between the side doors on one side and four on the opposite side. When the locomotive is observed from the side with three windows, its no. 1 end will be to the viewer's left. As on the later Class 4E, the locomotive had side doors on both sides behind each cab.

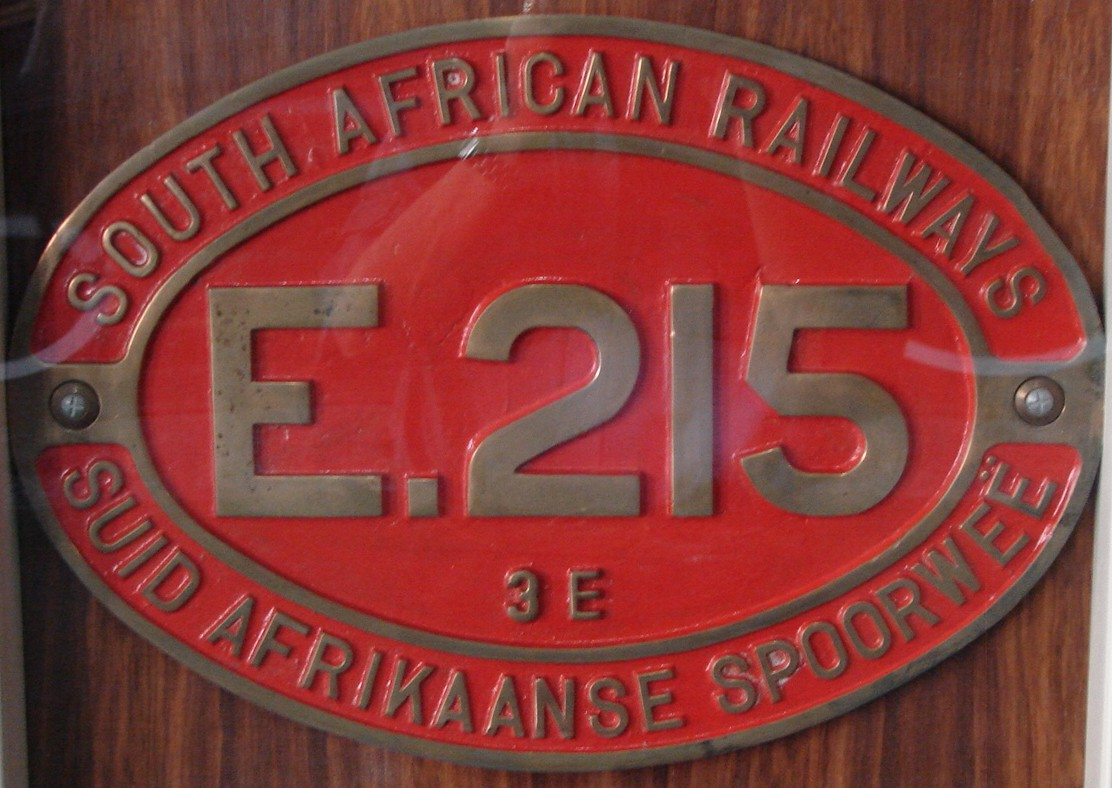
Builder's plate

Like the Classes 1E, 2E and 4E, the Class 3E had bogie-mounted draft gear, therefore no train forces were transmitted to the locomotive body. It had a Co+Co wheel arrangement with an articulated inter-bogie linkage.

For the passenger role, provision was made for both electric and steam heating of passenger coaches, although the electric heating feature was never used on mainline passenger trains. The Class 3E had an on-board steam-heating boiler for train heating and were the only electric units to have this feature. Subsequent electric locomotive models like the Classes 4E, 5E and 6E used separate steam wagons on passenger service during the winter months.

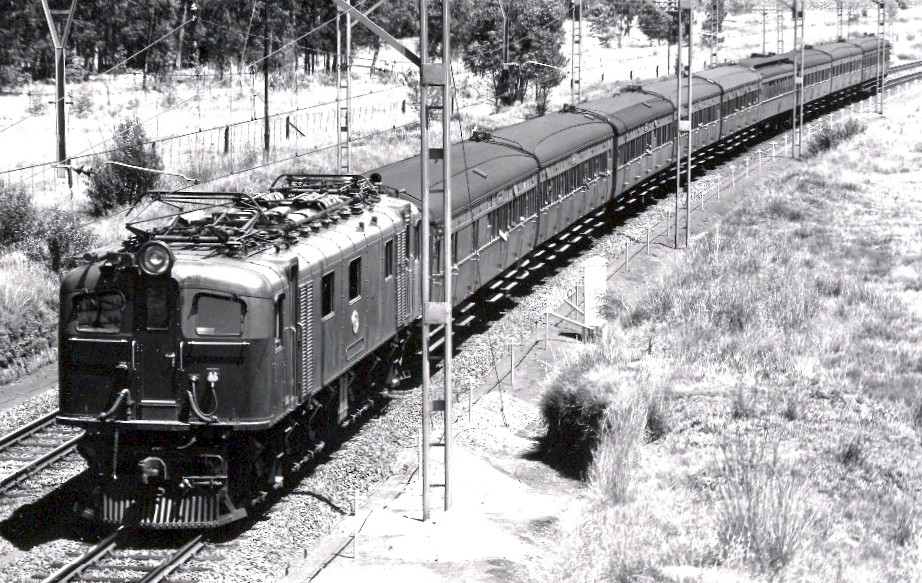
Class 3E on the Pretoria-Johannesburg express commuter

Unlike Cape Town's and Durban's suburban trainsets, those working around Johannesburg had jumper connections on the roof above the end connecting doors. The Class 3Es were also equipped with these connections, immediately to the right hand side of each headlight. During a shortage of suburban motor coaches c. 1948–1949, Class 3Es were used to haul suburban sets on the Witwatersrand and it is likely that the electric heating system was used during those winters. In the picture alongside showing rarely seen snow on the ground along the Johannesburg-Pretoria line on the Transvaal Highveld, the roof jumper connections between the suburban coaches and next to the unit's headlight are visible.

The locomotives entered service in an all-green livery which was changed to green with yellow whiskers in the 1950s and to gulf red with yellow whiskers in the 1960s.

== Service ==
The Class 3E was the first six-axle electric locomotive in SAR service and was geared for a maximum safe speed of 105 kilometres per hour (65 miles per hour). It was designed for both goods and passenger working on the Western Transvaal System, where higher speeds were possible on track with less severe curvature than on the lower Natal mainline. Some did enter service in Natal in 1948, but since they were not really suitable for Natal's tight and constant curvature, some difficulty was experienced with cracked frames and these units were soon also transferred to Johannesburg. The whole class was based at the Electric Running Shed at Braamfontein, where they remained for the rest of their service lives.

The Class 3E was a versatile locomotive, equally at home on heavy goods trains or hauling the Blue Train at its maximum speed. Since it was a powerful locomotive, it invariably worked as single unit and double-heading was rare. In 1951, after the Cape mainline west of Johannesburg was electrified from Randfontein via Bank as far as Welverdiend 60 miles (97 kilometres) from Johannesburg, Class 3E locomotives were assigned to work top-link south-bound passenger trains to that station, from where a Klerksdorp-based Class 23 would take over. This was part of the scheme to eliminate steam traction out of the new Johannesburg station. All surviving 3E's were staged at Braamfontein in c. 1983-84 and scrapped, with the exception of no. E201.

== Preservation ==
No. E201, the only survivor of the Class, was stored for several years under a shelter at the Bellville locomotive depot in Cape Town along with a few other early SAR electric and diesel-electric locomotives which were earmarked for preservation. During 2015, most of these locomotives were relocated to Bloemfontein, including the Class 3E.

== Works numbers ==
The RSH works numbers of the Class 3E are shown in the table.

Class 3E
Loco no.	Works no.
E191	7215
E192	7216
E193	7217
E194	7218
E195	7219
E196	7220
E197	7221
E198	7222
E199	7223
E200	7224
E201	7225
E202	7226
E203	7227
E204	7228
E205	7229
E206	7230
E207	7231
E208	7232
E209	7233
E210	7234
E211	7235
E212	7236
E213	7237
E214	7238
E215	7239
E216	7240
E217	7241
E218	7242

== Illustration ==
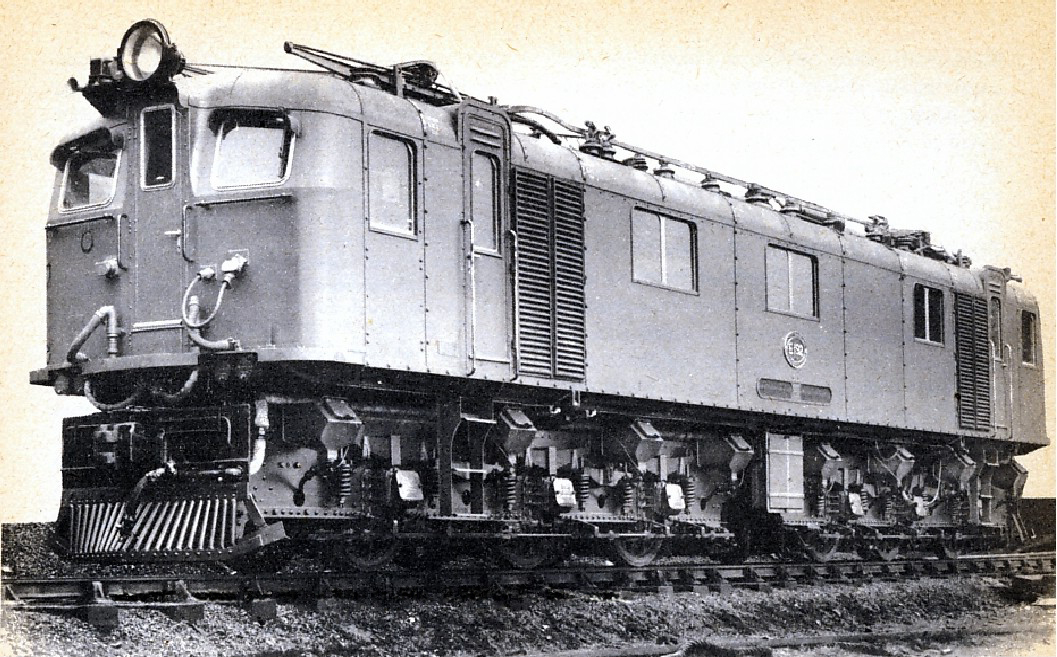
SAR&H publicity picture of no. E192, c. 1947, showing the "left" side with three side windows, two small grilles on the lower body side and the jumper connection next to the headlight

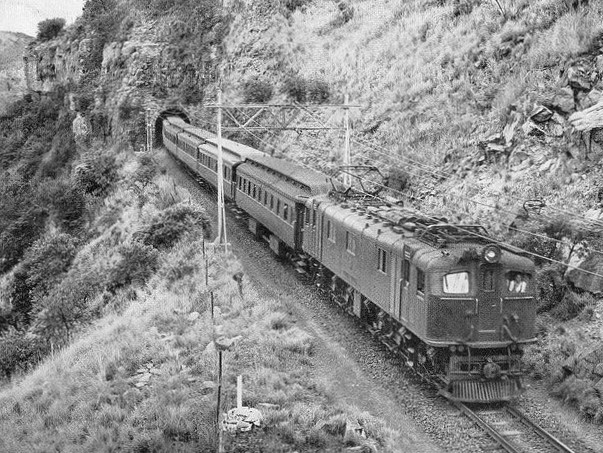
Class 3E exiting the tunnel between New Formosa and New Beacon Hill stations on the old 1918 Mooirivier-Estcourt deviation, abandoned c. 1957

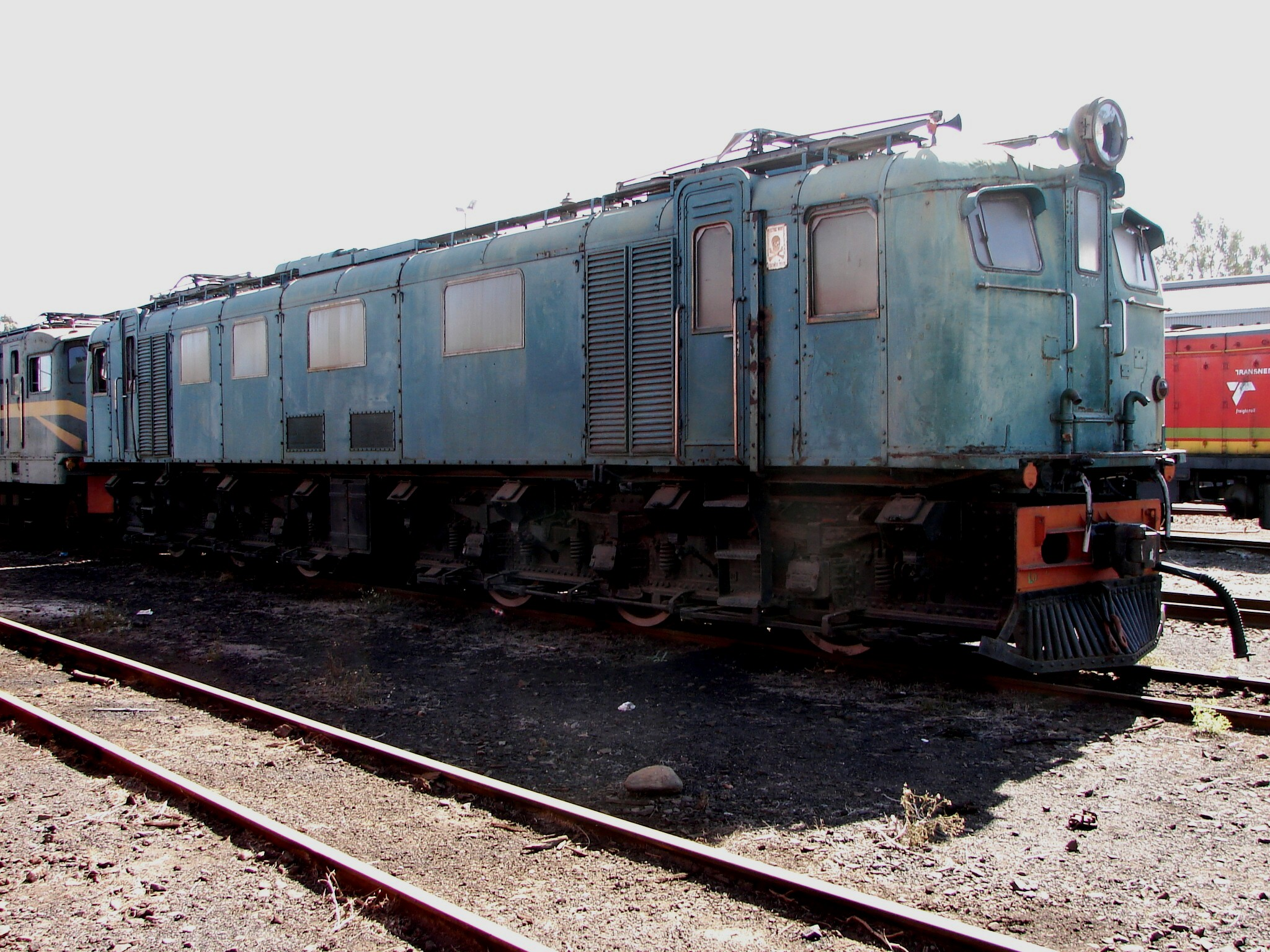
No. E201, showing the "right" side with four side windows and two larger grilles on the lower body side, Bloemfontein, 18 September 2015

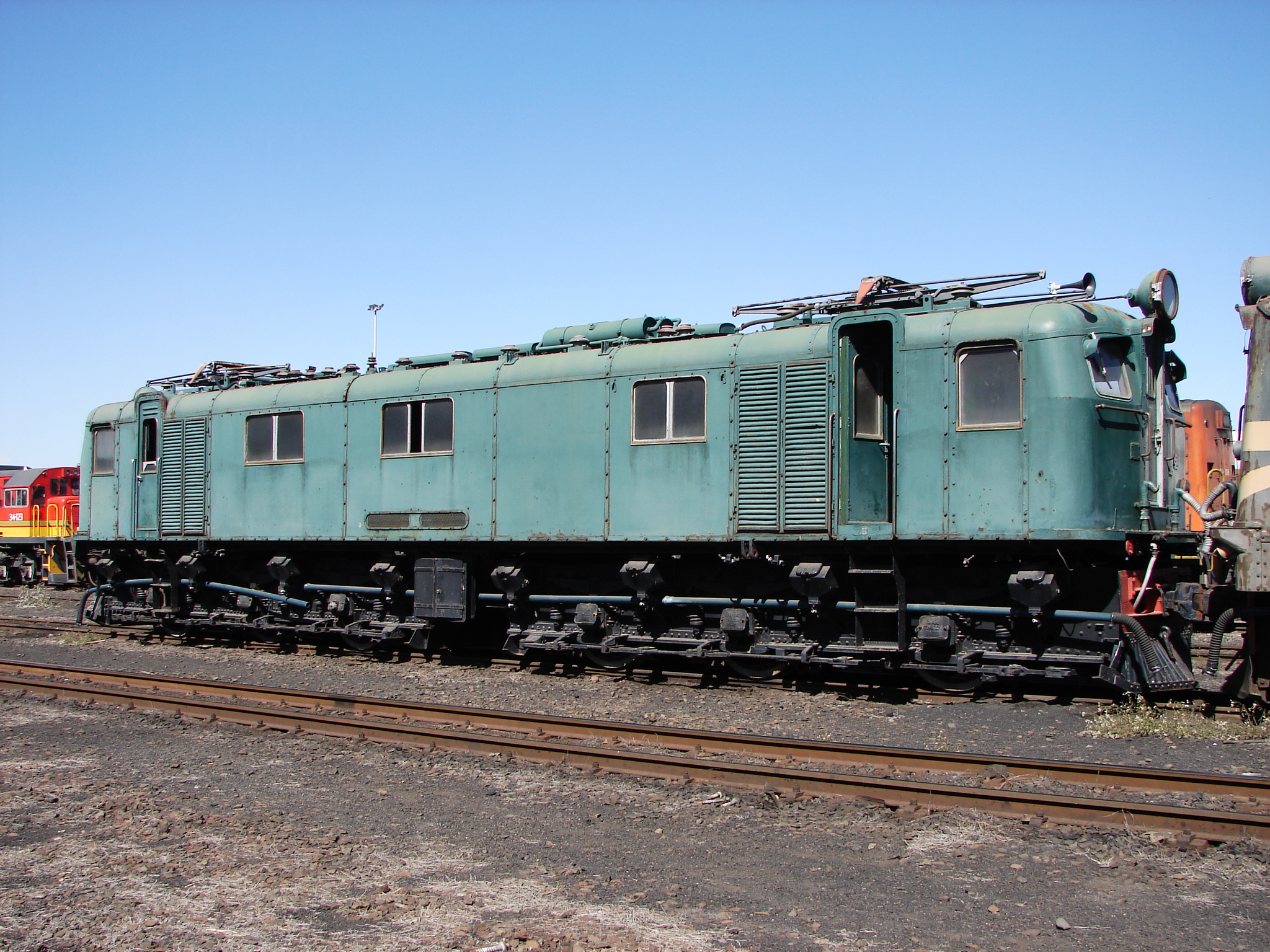
No. E201, showing the "left" side with three side windows and two narrow grilles on the lower body side, Bloemfontein, 18 September 2015
