= South African Class 2E =

South African electric locomotive

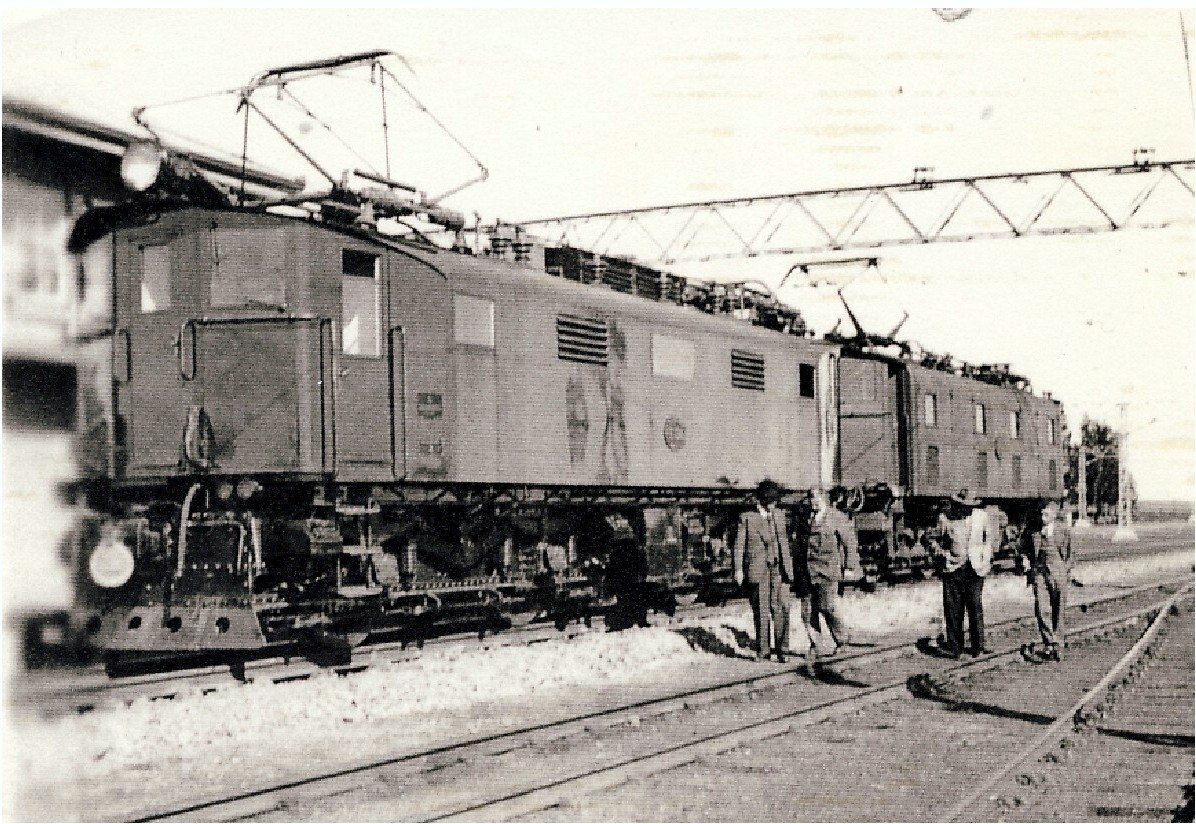
- Class 2E locomotive in MU operation with a Class 1E
Type and origin
- Power type: Electric
- Designer: Siemens-Schuckert
- Builder: Henschel & Son
- Serial number: 23132-23134
- Model: Siemens 2E
- Build date: 1937
- Total produced: 3
Specifications
- Configuration
  - AAR: B-B
  - UIC: Bo+Bo
  - Commonwealth: Bo+Bo
- Gauge: 3 ft 6 in (1,067 mm) Cape gauge
- Wheel diameter: 48 in (1,219 mm)
- Wheelbase: 30 ft 11 in (9,423 mm)
  - Bogie: 9 ft 3 in (2,819 mm)
- Pivot centres: 21 ft 8 in (6,604 mm)
- Panto shoes: 26 ft 4 1/2 in (8,039 mm)
- Length
  - Over couplers: 43 ft 8 in (13,310 mm)
  - Over beams: 30 ft 8 in (9,347 mm)
- Width: 9 ft 2.2 in (2,799 mm)
- Height
  - Pantograph: 13 ft (3,962 mm)
  - Body height: 11 ft 1 53/64 in (3,399 mm)
- Axle load: 16 LT 15 cwt (17,020 kg)
  - Leading: 33 LT 10 cwt (34,040 kg)
  - Trailing: 33 LT 2 cwt (33,630 kg)
- Adhesive weight: 66 LT 12 cwt (67,670 kg)
- Loco weight: 66 LT 12 cwt (67,670 kg)
- Electric system/s: 3 kV DC catenary
- Current pickup(s): Pantographs
- Traction motors: Four
  - Rating 1 hour: 402 hp (300 kW)
- Gear ratio: 17:75
- MU working: 3 maximum
- Train brakes: Air & Vacuum
- Couplers: AAR knuckle
Performance figures
- Maximum speed: 45 mph (72 km/h)
- Power output
  - 1 hour: 1,608 hp (1,199 kW)
- Tractive effort
  - 1 hour: 21,200 lbf (94 kN)
Career
- Operators: South African Railways
- Class: Class 2E
- Number in class: 3
- Numbers: E134-E136
- Delivered: 1937
- First run: 1937
- Withdrawn: 1973

The South African Railways Class 2E of 1937 was an electric locomotive.

In 1937, the South African Railways placed three German-built Class 2E 3 kV DC electric locomotives with a Bo+Bo wheel arrangement in mainline service.

== Manufacturer ==
South Africa's second mainline electric locomotive type, the Class 2E, entered service in Natal in 1937, intended for mixed traffic haulage. The electrical equipment was designed by Siemens-Schuckert of Berlin and the three locomotives were built for the South African Railways (SAR) by Henschel and Son in Germany. Numbered in the range from E134 to E136, they were the only German-built electric locomotives ever supplied to South Africa.

== Characteristics ==
The Class 2E was very similar in external appearance and dimensions to the Class 1E and used identical bogies. The most obvious distinction from the Class 1E was the difference in window and grille layout on the locomotive sides. The internal arrangement of their electrical components differed from those of the Class 1E and their four 402 horsepower (300 kilowatts) traction motors made them more powerful. Even so, probably as a result of the outbreak of the Second World War in 1939, only these three units were ever acquired, after which the SAR reverted to the Class 1E, Series 5 to 7 for its subsequent acquisitions of similar electric locomotives.

The body of the locomotive was divided into a high voltage chamber and a low voltage auxiliary machine and equipment compartment with a side corridor along the right side of the locomotive when looking towards Cab 1. In the high tension chamber, 43 contactors were arranged along one side with the motor-generator set in the middle of the chamber. The motor-generator was a four-machine unit comprising a high tension motor, two DC exciters, one for each motor, and the 110 V generator for the auxiliary equipment. The machines were flexibly coupled with a blower fan directly coupled at each end of the four-unit set, each fan supplying air to two of the main motors.

The Class 2E had a Bo+Bo wheel arrangement with an articulated inter-bogie linkage. Like the Classes 1E, 3E and 4E, it had bogie-mounted draft gear, therefore no train forces were transmitted to the locomotive body.

== Orientation ==
These dual cab locomotives had three windows with a grille between each pair of windows on one side, and a line of five grilles and two windows from left to right on the other side. When observing the locomotive from the side with the five grilles and two windows, the number 1 end of the locomotive would be to the left.

== Service ==
The Class 2E could be, and were, utilised in multiple working with Class 1E units, but this did not apply to regenerative working. During the 1940s steam traction still ruled the mainlines, but the use of electric locomotives through Johannesburg station and on general Reef hauler service became commonplace in an attempt to reduce the smoke nuisance in the central business district.

They spent most of their years in service on the mainline between Transvaal and Natal. By 1946 they were mainly employed working between Pretoria and Johannesburg. They briefly served in the Western Cape near the end of their service lives. All three units were withdrawn from service in 1973.

== Illustration ==
The main picture shows a Class 2E unit with its right side and no. 2 end visible, coupled to a Class 1E unit.

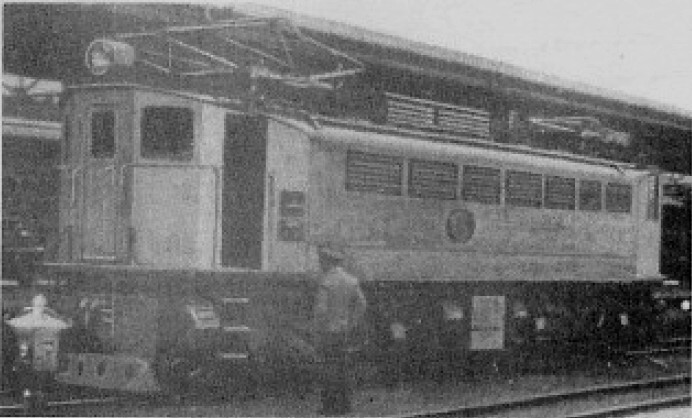
A Class 2E unit with its left side and no. 1 end visible, Pretoria, c. 1947
