= South African Class DS1 =

Class of 1 South African 0-6-0de locomotive

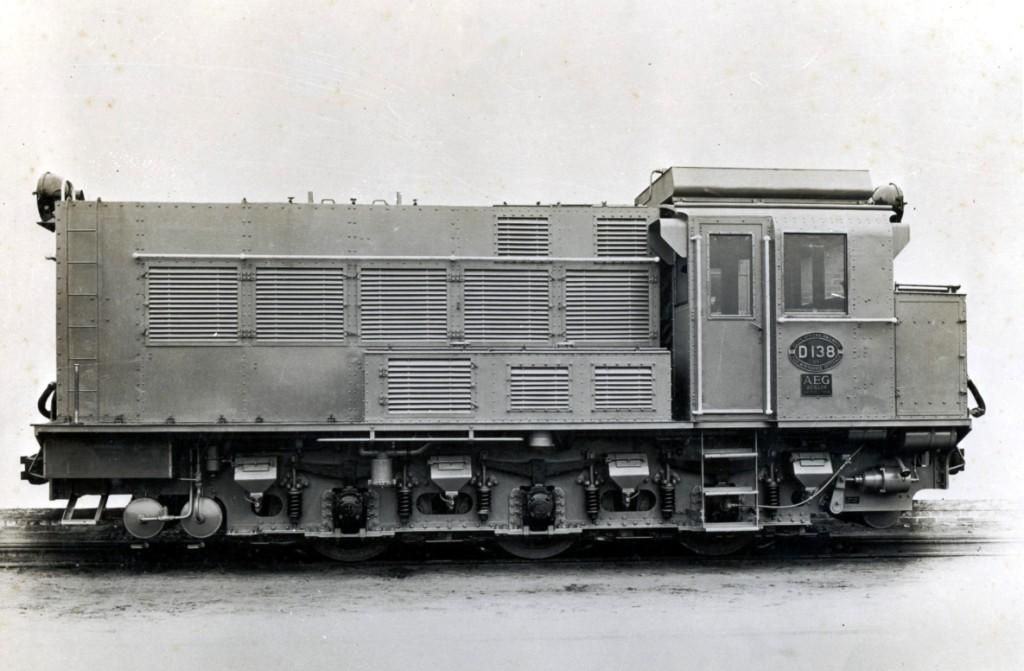
- No. D138, c. 1940
Type and origin
- Power type: Diesel-electric
- Designer: Allgemeine Elektricitäts-Gesellschaft
- Builder: Allgemeine Elektricitäts-Gesellschaft
- Serial number: AEG 5062/1939 (ESKOM locomotive)
- Model: SAR DS1
- Build date: 1939
- Total produced: 2
Specifications
- Configuration
  - Whyte: 6wDE
  - AAR: C
  - UIC: Co
  - Commonwealth: Co
- Gauge: 3 ft 6 in (1,067 mm) Cape gauge
- Wheel diameter: 42 in (1,067 mm)
- Wheelbase: 11 ft 4 in (3,454 mm)
- Length
  - Over couplers: 30 ft 8 1/2 in (9,360 mm)
  - Over beams: 27 ft 10 1/2 in (8,496 mm)
- Height: 12 ft 6 3/4 in (3,829 mm)
- Axle load: 14 LT 7 cwt (14,580 kg)
- Loco weight: 40 LT 13 cwt (41.3 t)
- Fuel type: Diesel
- Fuel capacity: 289 imp gal (1,310 L)
- Prime mover: MAN 265 hp (198 kW)
- Generator: AEG 110 kW (150 hp) main AEG 12 kW (16 hp) auxiliary
- Traction motors: Three AEG
- Cylinders: Eight
- Gear ratio: 5.67:1
- Couplers: AAR knuckle Johnston link-and-pin (1956)
Performance figures
- Power output: 265 hp (198 kW)
- Tractive effort
  - Starting: 17,600 lbf (78 kN)
- Factor of adh.: 5•15
Career
- Operators: South African Railways; ESKOM
- Class: Class DS1
- Number in class: 1 SAR, 1 ESKOM
- Numbers: D138, renumbered D514
- Official name: Citelec (ESKOM)
- Delivered: 1939
- First run: 1939

The South African Railways Class DS1 of 1939 was a diesel-electric locomotive.

The second diesel-electric locomotive on the South African Railways was a single Class DS1 AEG diesel-electric shunting locomotive which was placed in service in 1939. Two of these locomotives were delivered to South Africa, one for the Railways and another for the Electricity Supply Commission.

== Manufacturer ==
As a result of the problems experienced in obtaining adequate water supplies in the arid regions of South Africa and South West Africa, particularly on the section between De Aar in the Karoo via Upington to Keetmanshoop, the South African Railways (SAR) decided to experiment with diesel-powered traction and introduced its first two diesel-electric shunting locomotives in 1939.

The second of these was a single six-wheeled locomotive of which two units were ordered from Allgemeine Elektricitäts-Gesellschaft (AEG) in Berlin at the same time as the single Class DS locomotive.

Only one of them entered service on the SAR and was designated Class DS1. It was initially numbered D138, but it was soon renumbered to D514. Both numbers were actually in the electric locomotive number range.

The second locomotive was delivered to the Electricity Supply Commission (ESCOM), the state-owned South African national power corporation, who placed it in service in Cape Town.

== Characteristics ==
The locomotive was powered by a Maschinenfabrik Augsburg-Nürnberg (MAN) 265 horsepower (198 kilowatts) eight-cylinder diesel engine prime mover. An AEG 110 kilowatts (150 horsepower) main generator and an AEG 12 kilowatts (16 horsepower) auxiliary generator were mounted directly in line between the engine and the cab. The engine was water-cooled with a fan that was belt-driven by the engine and that drew air through a conventional radiator.

This three-axle locomotive was essentially half a Class DS locomotive. Each axle was driven by a force-ventitated axle-suspended DC traction motor and sanding was arranged at the back and front of all wheels. Its single engine compartment was identical to either one of the two engine compartments of the Class DS. The cab was also identical to that of the Class DS, equipped with mechanically interlocked dual controls to enable operation in either direction.

== Service ==
=== South African Railways ===
The SAR Class DS1 was withdrawn from yard service in July 1956 and transferred to the SAR's Civil Engineering department, who continued to use it for shunting at the Braamfontein Electric Running Shed (ERS) in Johannesburg into the early 1960s. Since it was used to move trolleys with heavy traction motors around the workshop, the original AAR knuckle coupler was replaced by a low-mounted Johnston link-and-pin coupler and the original coupler pockets were blanked off.

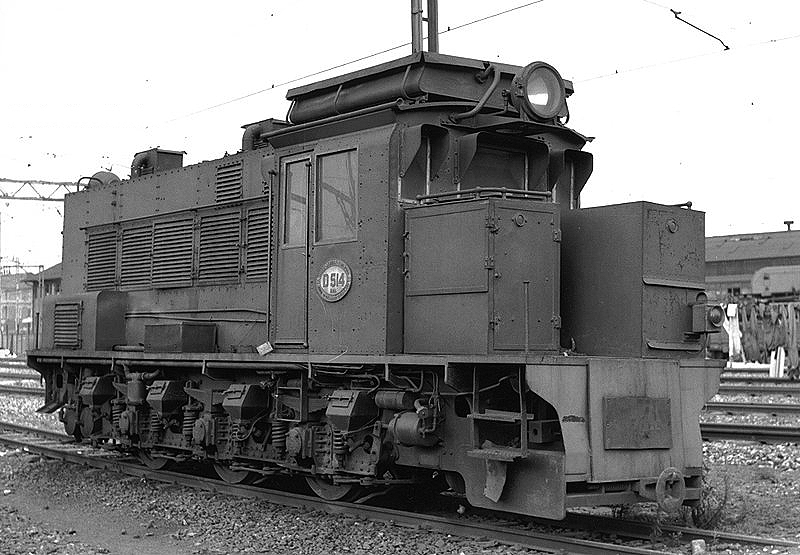
No. D514 at Braamfontein Electric Running Shed

When it was finally retired from service and replaced by a Class S2 shunting steam locomotive, it was plinthed on a short piece of track on the western side of the Braamfontein ERS. The picture alongside shows the locomotive at Braamfontein, with the bell coupler mounted barely above track level and with the original coupler pocket blanked off.

=== ESKOM ===
The ESKOM locomotive was initially employed by the City of Cape Town at the Table Bay Power Station. It was painted in a maroon livery and was named Citelek. It was later transferred to the Athlone Power Station in Cape Town, where it was scrapped in about 1966.
