= South African Class DS =

South african locomotive

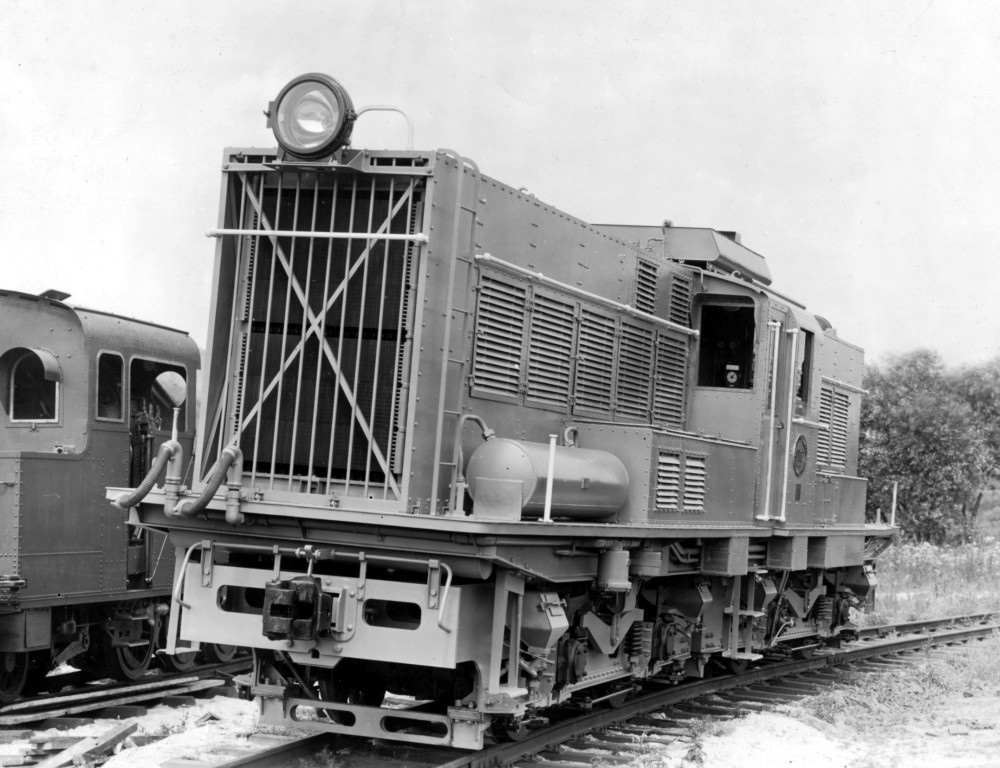
- Class DS shunting locomotive, c. 1940
Type and origin
- Power type: Diesel-electric
- Designer: Allgemeine Elektricitäts-Gesellschaft
- Builder: Allgemeine Elektricitäts-Gesellschaft
- Model: SAR DS
- Build date: 1939
- Total produced: 1
Specifications
- Configuration
  - AAR: B-B
  - UIC: Bo'Bo'
  - Commonwealth: Bo-Bo
- Gauge: 3 ft 6 in (1,067 mm) Cape gauge
- Wheel diameter: 42 in (1,067 mm)
- Wheelbase: 30 ft 4 in (9,246 mm)
  - Bogie: 8 ft 6 in (2,591 mm)
- Pivot centres: 21 ft 10 in (6,655 mm)
- Length
  - Over couplers: 46 ft 6 in (14,173 mm)
  - Over beams: 43 ft 8 in (13,310 mm)
- Height: 12 ft 11 3/4 in (3,956 mm)
- Axle load: 16 LT 12 cwt (16,870 kg)
- Adhesive weight: 66 LT 8 cwt (67,470 kg)
- Loco weight: 66 LT 8 cwt (67,470 kg)
- Fuel type: Diesel
- Fuel capacity: 455 imp gal (2,070 L)
- Prime mover: Two MAN 265 hp (198 kW)
- Engine type: Diesel
- Generator: Two AEG 110 kW (150 hp) main Two AEG 12 kW (16 hp) auxiliary
- Traction motors: Four AEG
- Cylinders: Eight
- Gear ratio: 5.67:1
- Couplers: AAR knuckle
Performance figures
- Power output: 410 hp (310 kW)
- Tractive effort
  - Starting: 35,200 lbf (157 kN)
- Factor of adh.: 4•2
Career
- Operators: South African Railways
- Class: Class DS
- Number in class: 1
- Numbers: D137, renumbered D513
- Delivered: 1939
- First run: 1939
- Scrapped: November 1966

The South African Railways Class DS of 1939 was a diesel-electric locomotive.

The first diesel-electric locomotive on the South African Railways was a single Class DS AEG diesel-electric shunting locomotive which was placed in service at the Congella yards near Durban in 1939.

== Diesel-steam comparison ==
Around 1935, the question of purchasing diesel locomotives for the South African Railways (SAR) was seriously considered. Even though South Africa was a coal-rich country with, at the time, the lowest pit-head prices in the world and no oil wells, there were definite advantages in favour of the diesel-electric locomotive. It did not need to take water en route, could undertake very long runs without the need to refuel or change locomotives and had a much higher rate of availability.

The first costs were much in favour of steam locomotives, for which it decreased in cost per unit of power as the size increased, an advantage that the diesel-electric did not seem to have. Large diesel-electric locomotives of more than 1,500 horsepower (1,100 kilowatts) were usually three to four times greater in first cost than steam locomotives of equal power. In addition, unless it was supercharged, a diesel lost 3% of its rated power output with every increase of 1,000 feet (305 metres) in altitude.

== Manufacturer ==
As a result of the problems experienced to obtain adequate water supplies of good quality in the arid regions of South Africa and South West Africa, particularly on the section from De Aar via Upington to Keetmanshoop, the SAR decided to experiment with diesel-powered traction and introduced its first two diesel-electric shunting locomotives in 1939.

The first of these was a single twin-engined centre-cab locomotive with a Bo-Bo wheel arrangement which was ordered from Allgemeine Elektricitäts-Gesellschaft (AEG) in Berlin for use as a shunting engine. The locomotive was designated Class DS and was initially numbered D137, but it was soon renumbered to D513. Both numbers were in the electric locomotive number range, but with a "D" for diesel instead of an "E" for electric number prefix.

== Characteristics ==
The 66 long tons 8 hundredweight (67,470 kilograms) locomotive was powered by two Maschinenfabrik Augsburg-Nürnberg (MAN) 265 horsepower (198 kilowatts) eight-cylinder diesel engine prime movers, one on either side of the cab. An AEG 110 kilowatts (150 horsepower) main generator and an AEG 12 kilowatts (16 horsepower) auxiliary generator were mounted directly in line between each engine and the cab. Each engine was water-cooled with a fan which was belt-driven by its engine and which drew air through a conventional radiator.

The bogies were very similar to those of the Class 1E electric locomotive, each with two DC traction motors arranged in series. Each bogie axle was driven by a force-ventitated axle-suspended DC traction motor, with the two motors on each bogie electrically arranged in series. The cab was equipped with mechanically interlocked dual controls to enable operation in either direction.

== Service ==
The locomotive was placed in service at the Congella yards near Durban. Even though performance-wise the results were rather disappointing, it nevertheless remained in service for 28 years.

The first diesel-electric locomotive on the SAR eventually found its way to Cape Town where it was scrapped at the Salt River Works in November 1966.

== Illustration ==
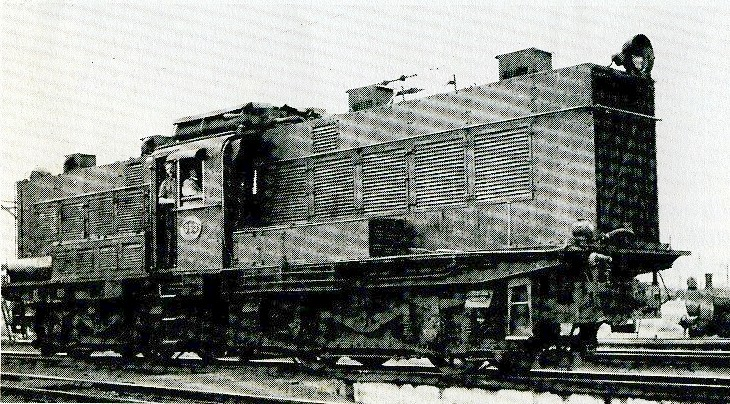
Class DS no. D137, c. 1940
