= Danskraal =

Danskraal Daimana
- Location within KwaZulu-Natal Location within South Africa
- Coordinates: 28.537°S 29.795°E
- Country: South Africa
- Province: KwaZulu-Natal
- District: Uthukela
- Municipality: Alfred Duma
- Time zone: UTC+2 (SAST)

Danskraal is a historic site some 5 km north-east of Ladysmith in the former Kliprivier district, said to be the place where the Voortrekkers camped a week before the famous Battle of Blood River on 16 December 1838 and where the first vow was taken which led to the Day of the Covenant. The name means 'village of dancing'; it was here that the Voortrekker commando was entertained with ceremonial dances by the Zulus of Matowan or Nodotta.

The South African Railways has locomotive workshops at Danskraal, which was still known as Daimana in c. 1935.
