= Colenso Power Station =

South African coal-fired power station

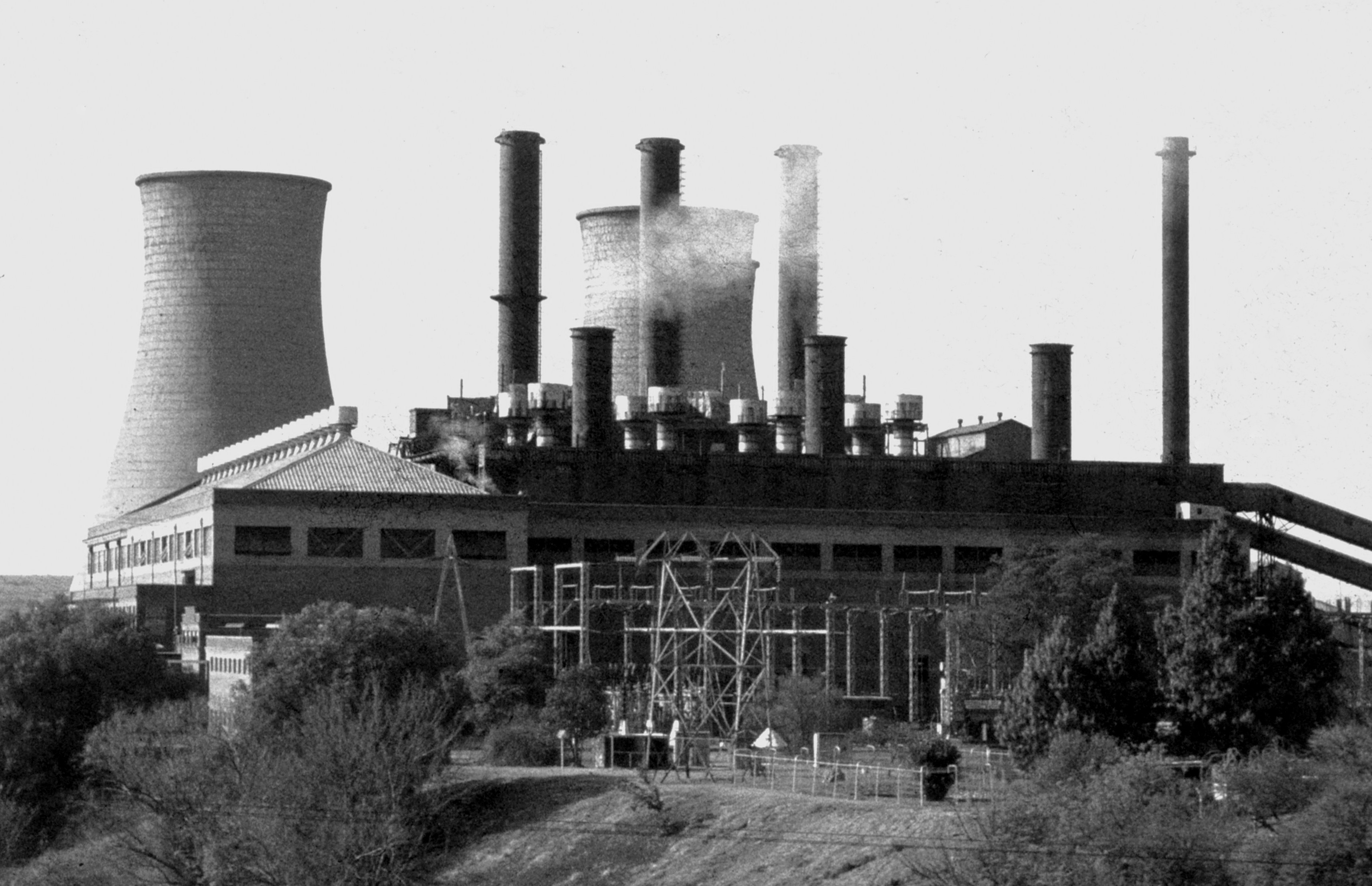
- View of Colenso Power Station in the 1970's.
- Country: South Africa
- Coordinates: 28°43′51″S 29°49′36″E
- Status: Decommissioned
- Commission date: 1926
- Decommission date: 1984

Thermal power station
- Primary fuel: Coal

Power generation
- Units operational: 5
- Nameplate capacity: 160 Megawatt

External images
- Photo of the power station as seen from across the Tugela river at Eskom Heritage
- Photo of the Colenso turbines and boilers at Eskom heritage

Colenso Power Station was a South African coal-fired power station, located in Colenso, KwaZulu-Natal (Uthukela District Municipality) on the banks of the Tugela River. It was built in the 1920s by the South African Railways to supply electricity for the railways, and was subsequently sold to the Electricity Supply Commission (Eskom).

== History ==
Steep gradients on the Natal section of South African Railways, particularly in the Natal Midlands meant that electrification could be beneficial, particularly if regenerative braking was employed. In 1921 the estimated cost of the electrification project, inclusive of the Power Station was £2,033,000.

Building started in 1921 and the power station was opened in 1926 with a capacity of 60 MW. Initially it only provided power for the 274 km section of the Glencoe – Pietermaritzburg part of the Durban-Johannesburg railway – the area that had the greatest gradients, and also the area that was closest to the coalfields of the Glencoe region. Power generated at Colenso was distributed at 88,000 volts to twelve substations where it was converted to 6,600 volts and then to 3,000 volts DC current by synchronous motor generators for use by the railways.

The power station was sold to the Electricity Supply Commission (Eskom) in January 1927. It used coal that was brought in by rail from the coalfields of North Natal and water from the Tugela. It continued to be the provider of electrical power for the railways which by 1937 consisted of the whole of the Natal section of the Durban – Johannesburg line (516 route km) and the 229 km spur to Bethlehem in the Orange Free State. Between 1944 and 1959 a series of new generators were commissioned, resulting in the power station's capacity being increased to 160 MW. However, in the 1960s, changes in technology led to a change in the economics of power production. New power stations such as Ingagane were built at the coal fields themselves and the use 400 kVA power lines from 1972 onwards reduced the cost of transporting electricity. In the early 1980s Eskom initiated a major development programme: in 1980 new large power stations at Kriel (3,000 MW), Hendrina (2,000 MW) and Camden (1,600 MW) had been commissioned and in the next few years a number of other new power stations gave South Africa a surplus of generating capacity and many of the 1960s vintage power stations (including Colenso's refurbishment) had become uneconomic. This meant that the continued use of the Colenso power station was no longer economically viable. The original part of the power station was decommissioned in 1970 and the 1944-1959 extensions in 1985.

== Present day ==
The power station's cooling towers remain standing to this day. In recent years a concerted effort has been in process to re-establish a new, larger, independent base load power station near the original site of the old Colenso power station. With a substantial coal resource discovered near the town and with the gradual liberalising of the South African electric power generation industry, a modern coal technology power generation unit is planned.
