= South African Class 14E1 =

Type of electric locomotive

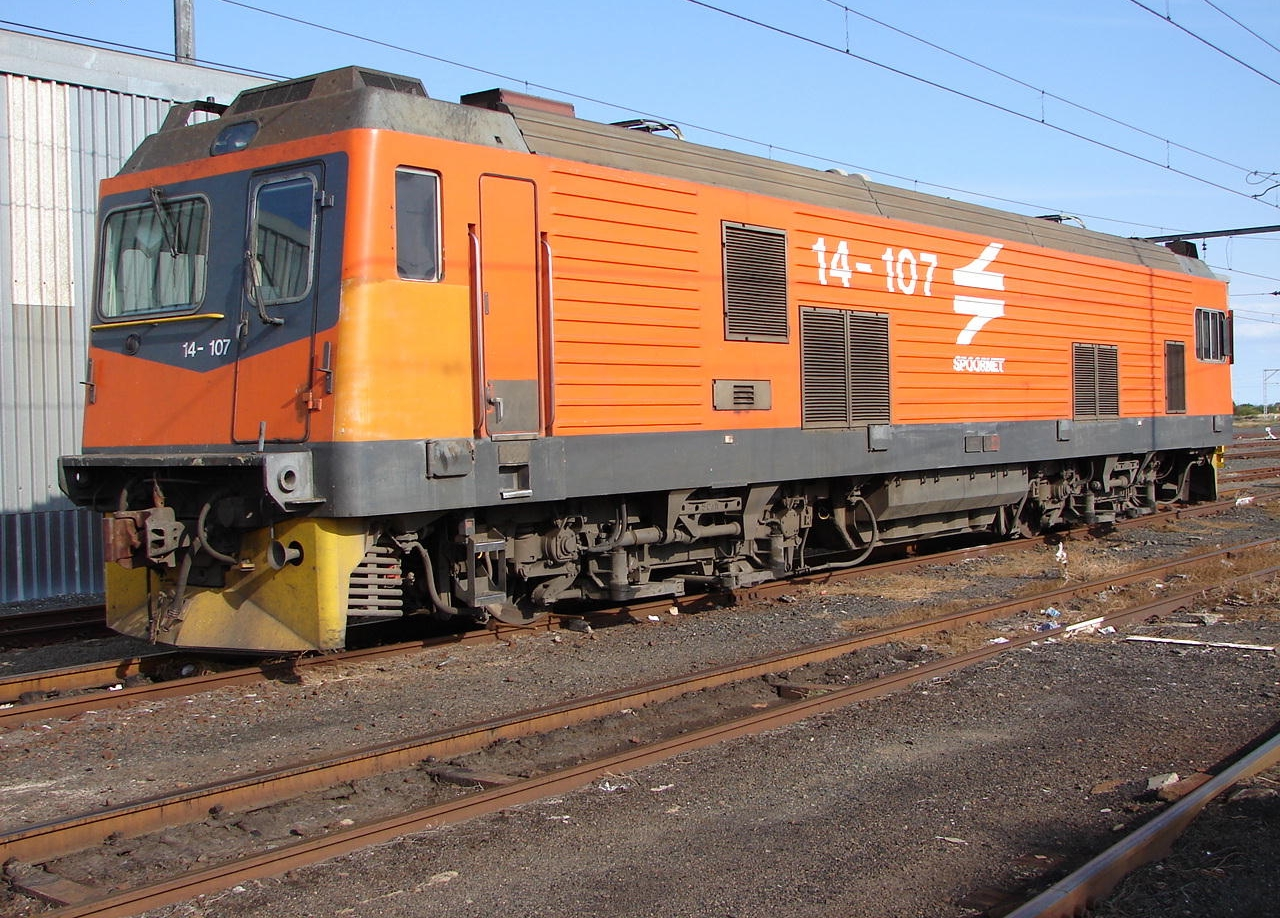
- No. 14-107 at Beaufort West on 1 May 2006
Type and origin
- Power type: Electric
- Designer: 50 ^{c}/s Group
- Builder: Union Carriage & Wagon
- Model: SLM 14E1
- Build date: 1993-1994
- Total produced: 10
Specifications
- Configuration
  - AAR: B-B
  - UIC: Bo'Bo'
  - Commonwealth: Bo-Bo
- Gauge: 3 ft 6 in (1,067 mm) Cape gauge
- Wheel diameter: 1,250 mm (49.2 in) new 1,170 mm (46.1 in) worn
- Minimum curve: 85 m (279 ft) radius
- Wheelbase: 12,400 mm (40 ft 8.2 in)
  - Bogie: 3,100 mm (10 ft 2.0 in)
- Pivot centres: 9,300 mm (30 ft 6.1 in)
- Panto shoes: 8,800 mm (28 ft 10.5 in)
- Length
  - Over couplers: 18,500 mm (60 ft 8.3 in)
  - Over body: 17,400 mm (57 ft 1.0 in)
- Width: 2,973 mm (9 ft 9.0 in)
- Height
  - Pantograph: 4,120 mm (13 ft 6.2 in)
  - Body height: 4,047 mm (13 ft 3.3 in)
- Axle load: 23,125 kg (50,982 lb)
- Adhesive weight: 92,500 kg (203,900 lb)
- Loco weight: 92,500 kg (203,900 lb)
- Electric system/s: Dual 3 kV DC & 25 kV AC 50 Hz catenary
- Current pickup(s): Pantographs
- Traction motors: Four Siemens ITB2 820-OGA03
  - Continuous: 1,020 kW (1,370 hp)
- Gear ratio: 18:67
- Loco brake: Air, Regenerative on 3 kV DC & Rheostatic on 25 kV AC
- Train brakes: Air
- Couplers: AAR knuckle
Performance figures
- Maximum speed: 140 km/h (87 mph)
- Power output
  - Continuous: 4,080 kW (5,470 hp)
- Tractive effort
  - Starting: 369 kN (83,000 lbf)
  - 1 hour: 110 kN (25,000 lbf) @ 130 km/h (81 mph)
  - Continuous: 245 kN (55,000 lbf) @ 58.6 km/h (36.4 mph)
- Brakeforce: 172 kN (39,000 lbf) @ 12 to 60.5 km/h (7.5 to 37.6 mph)
Career
- Operators: Spoornet; Transnet Freight Rail
- Class: Class 14E1
- Number in class: 10
- Numbers: 14-101 to 14-110
- Delivered: 1994
- First run: 1994
- Withdrawn: 2015

The Spoornet Class 14E1 of 1994 was a South African electric locomotive.

In December 1994 Spoornet took delivery of the last of ten locally manufactured Class 14E1 dual voltage electric mainline locomotives with a Bo-Bo wheel arrangement. They had been preceded in 1991 by three prototype Class 14E locomotives.

== Manufacturer ==
The dual voltage 3 kV DC and 25 kV AC Class 14E1 electric locomotive was designed by Consortium 14E consisting of Siemens, ABB, AEG-Westinghouse, General Electric Company and Alsthom-Atlantique, headed by Siemens. They were built for Spoornet by Union Carriage & Wagon (UCW) in Nigel, Transvaal, under licence to Swiss Locomotive and Machine Works (SLM) in Winterthur. Ten locomotives were delivered and placed in service by December 1994, numbered in the range from 14-101 to 14-110.

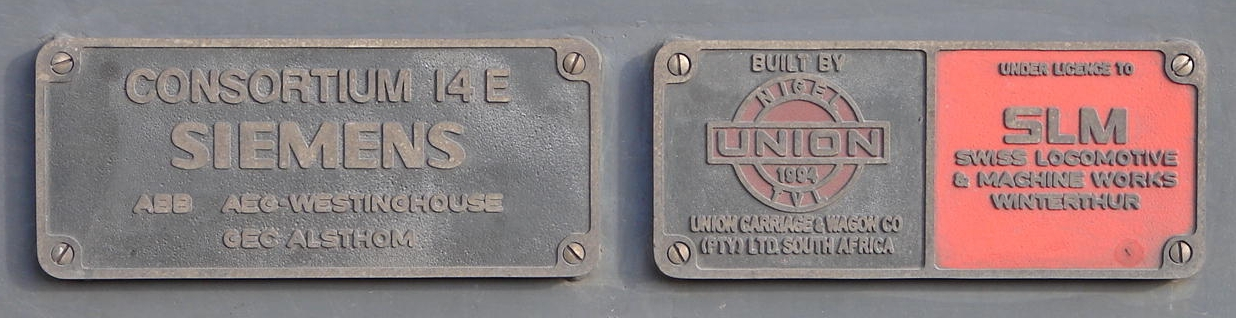
Builders' plates

The original order had been placed for fifty locomotives. The first units to be delivered were subjected to intensive trial runs on speed-freight trains in KwaZulu-Natal and the Free State, during which it was found not to be a suitable locomotive for the infrastructure on lines rated at 20 tonnes (20 long tons) per axle. It caused some damage to points when travelling at 80 kilometres per hour (50 miles per hour) in the Free State. When one of the units developed a vibration in the gear box, the order for fifty locomotives was summarily reduced to ten only given the unsatisfactory trial results to date.

== Characteristics ==
These dual cab locomotives had a roof access ladder on one side only, just to the right of the cab access door. The roof access ladder end was designated the no. 1 end. The cabs were connected by a corridor along the centre of the locomotive.

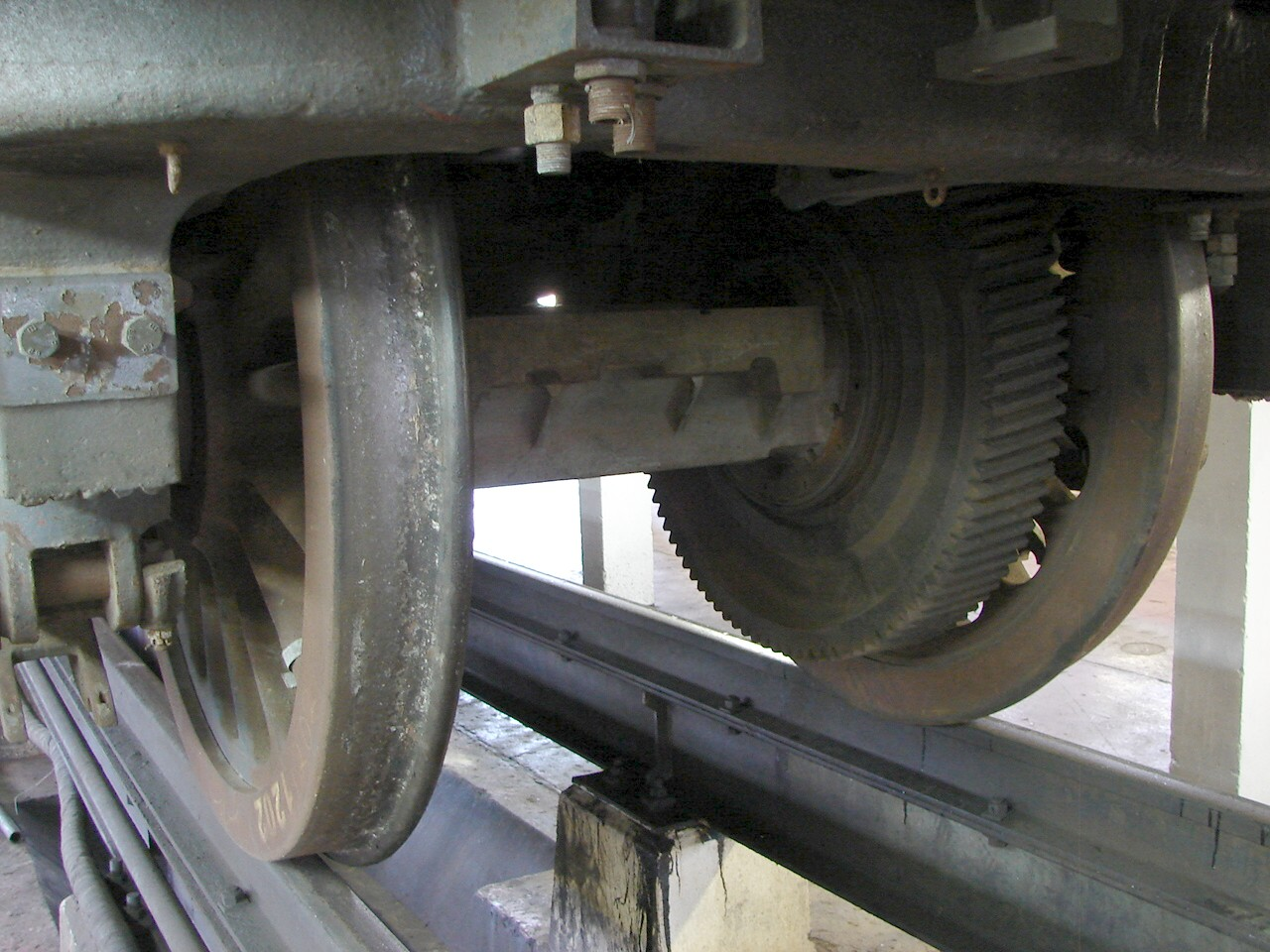
Class 14E1 spoked wheelset with helical gear

With the exception of the Class 9E, all previous South African electric locomotives ran on spoked wheels and used spur gears. The Swiss-built Class 14E ran on solid wheels and used double helical or herringbone gears with a traction motor to wheel gear ratio of 20:103, while the locally built Class 14E1 was delivered with the traditional spoked wheels but with helical gears and a traction motor to wheel gear ratio of 18:67.

Unlike the later dual voltage Classes 19E, 20E and 21E which were equipped to automatically transition between AC and DC mode on the run, the Class 14E1 had to be stopped and then restarted under the different voltage. Along with the earlier Class 14E, these electric locomotives were some of the most powerful at the time. They were equipped with three-phase AC motors (induction motors) made by Siemens and also incorporated Siemens' sophisticated train communication network system.

== Service ==
By 2006, Class 14E1 locomotives were all shedded at Bellville Loco in Cape Town. In freight service they were employed on the route between Cape Town and Beaufort West in the Western Cape. Since they are dual voltage 3 kV DC and 25 kV AC locomotives, they can work on any electrified line country-wide with the exception of the 50 kV AC Sishen-Saldanha iron ore line.

In 1998 a number of Spoornet's electric locomotives and most of their Class 38-000 electro-diesel locomotives were sold to Maquarie-GETX (General Electric Financing) and leased back to Spoornet for a ten-year period which was to expire in 2008. Of the Class 14E1, numbers 14-101 to 14-106 were also included in this leasing deal.

Beginning c. 2005, selected Class 14E1 locomotives were employed to haul the Blue Train all the way along the Cape Town-Pretoria route across the 25 kV AC stretch between Beaufort West and Kimberley. By 2012 they often ran country-wide when hauling the Blue Train. Being fast and giving a comfortable ride in an air conditioned cab, the Class 14E1 became popular with drivers.

From July 2012, possibly as a result of popular demand, eight of the Class 14E1 locomotives were repainted in a special blue Transnet Freight Rail (TFR) livery to match the Blue Train livery. After two incidents shortly thereafter, in 2013 with Class 14E1 no. 14-104 and in 2014 with Class 14E no. 14-001 when the locomotives caught fire and were destroyed while working the Blue Train, the Class was replaced by a pair of blue-liveried Class 18E locomotives on Blue Train service.

== Serial numbers ==
UCW did not allocate works numbers to the locomotives they built for Spoornet. On the Class 14E1, the transformer serial numbers are engraved in the top right corner of a large plate which depicts the circuit diagram of the transformer, mounted below the sill and halfway between the bogies on the roof access ladder side of the locomotive. These serial numbers do not follow the locomotive unit number sequence. Their transformer numbers, last livery and disposal are listed in the table.

Class 14E1 transformer numbers & disposal
| Loco no. | Transformer no. | Final livery and disposal |
|---|---|---|
| 14-101 | 16876-1- 9/1994 | Blue, found staged at Bellville Loco on 4 July 2017. |
| 14-102 | 16876-1- 4/1994 | Orange, wrecked at Deelfontein on 26 October 2005, shell sold 13 April 2010 at De Aar. |
| 14-103 | 16876-1- 7/1994 | Blue, found staged at Bellville Loco on 4 July 2017. |
| 14-104 | 16876-1-10/1994 | Blue, burnt near Kimberley in late 2012, sold on 18 September 2014 at Bellville. |
| 14-105 | 16876-1- 2/1993 | Orange, staged and stripped for parts for several years, sold on 15 July 2015 at Bellville. |
| 14-106 | 16876-1- 6/1994 | Blue, found staged at Bellville Loco on 4 July 2017. |
| 14-107 | 16876-1-11/1994 | Blue, found staged at Bellville Loco on 4 July 2017. |
| 14-108 | 16876-1- 3/1994 | Blue, found staged at Bellville Loco on 4 July 2017. |
| 14-109 | 16876-1- 8/1994 | Blue, found staged at Bellville Loco on 4 July 2017. |
| 14-110 | 16876-1- 5/1994 | Blue, reserved for preservation, moved to Bloemfontein Loco for museum. |

== Illustration ==
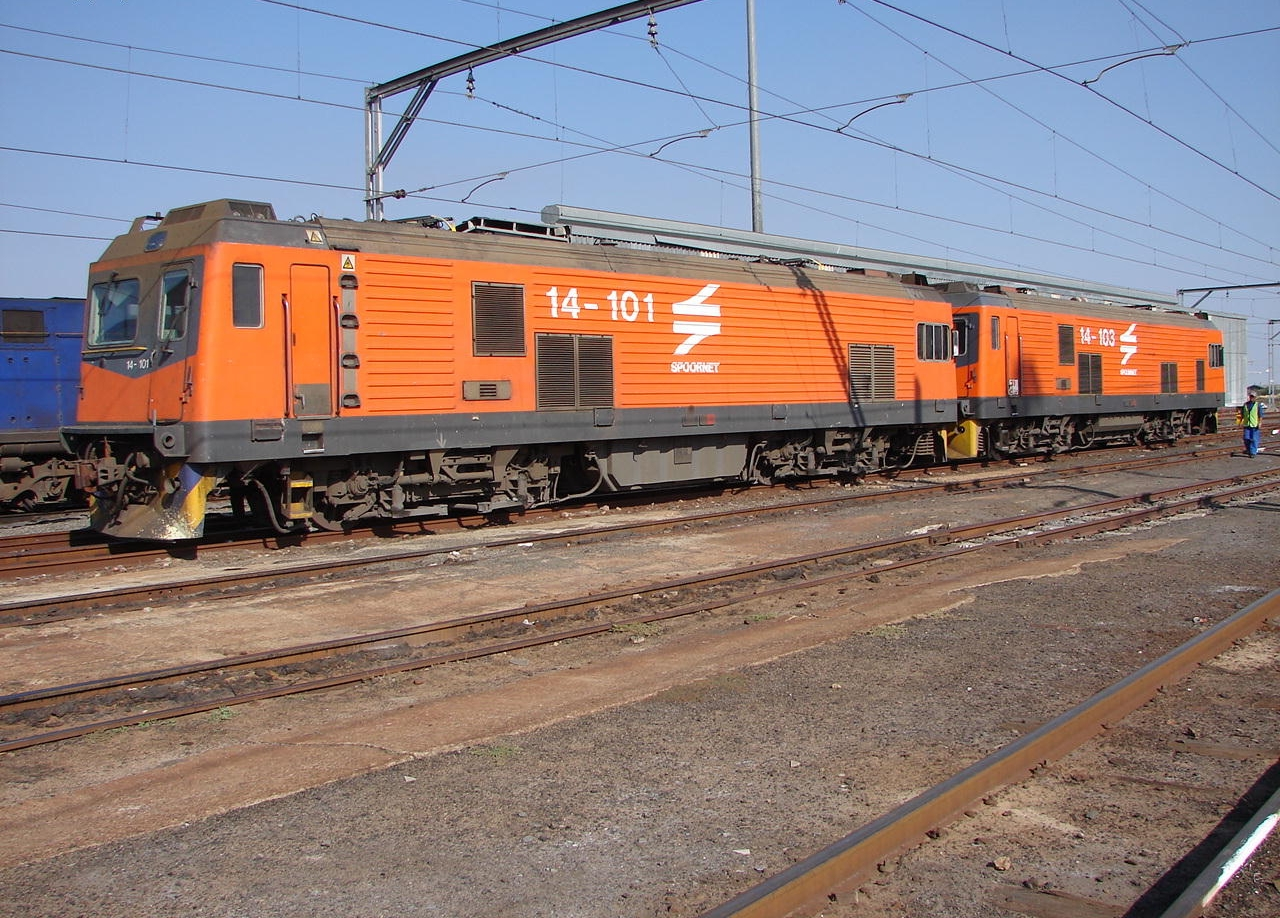
Numbers 14-101 and 14-103 at Beaufort West, Western Cape on 2 August 2007

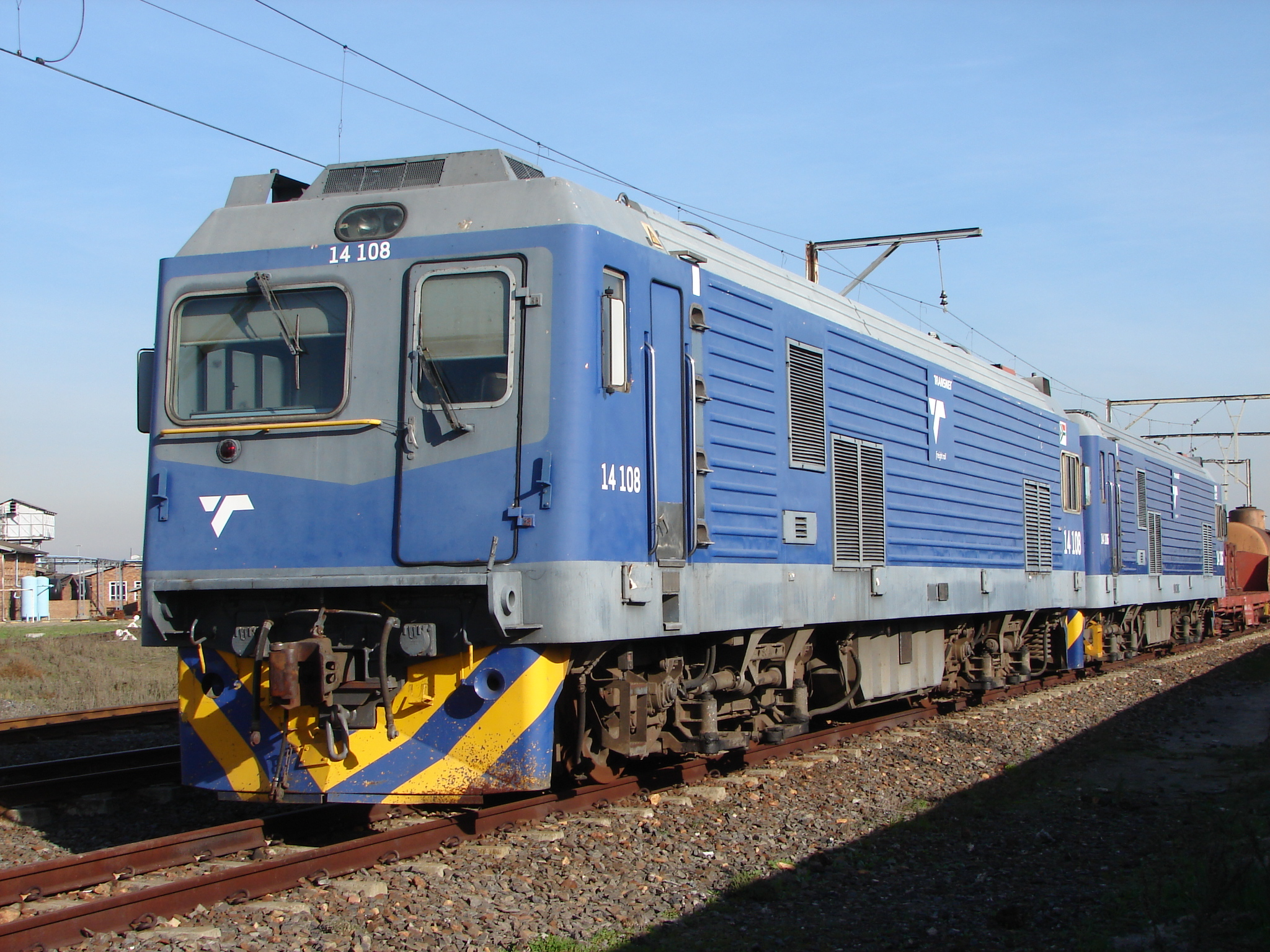
No. 14-108 in Blue Train livery at Bellville Locomotive Depot, Cape Town, 4 July 2015
