= South African Class 14E =

Class of 3 South African electric locomotives

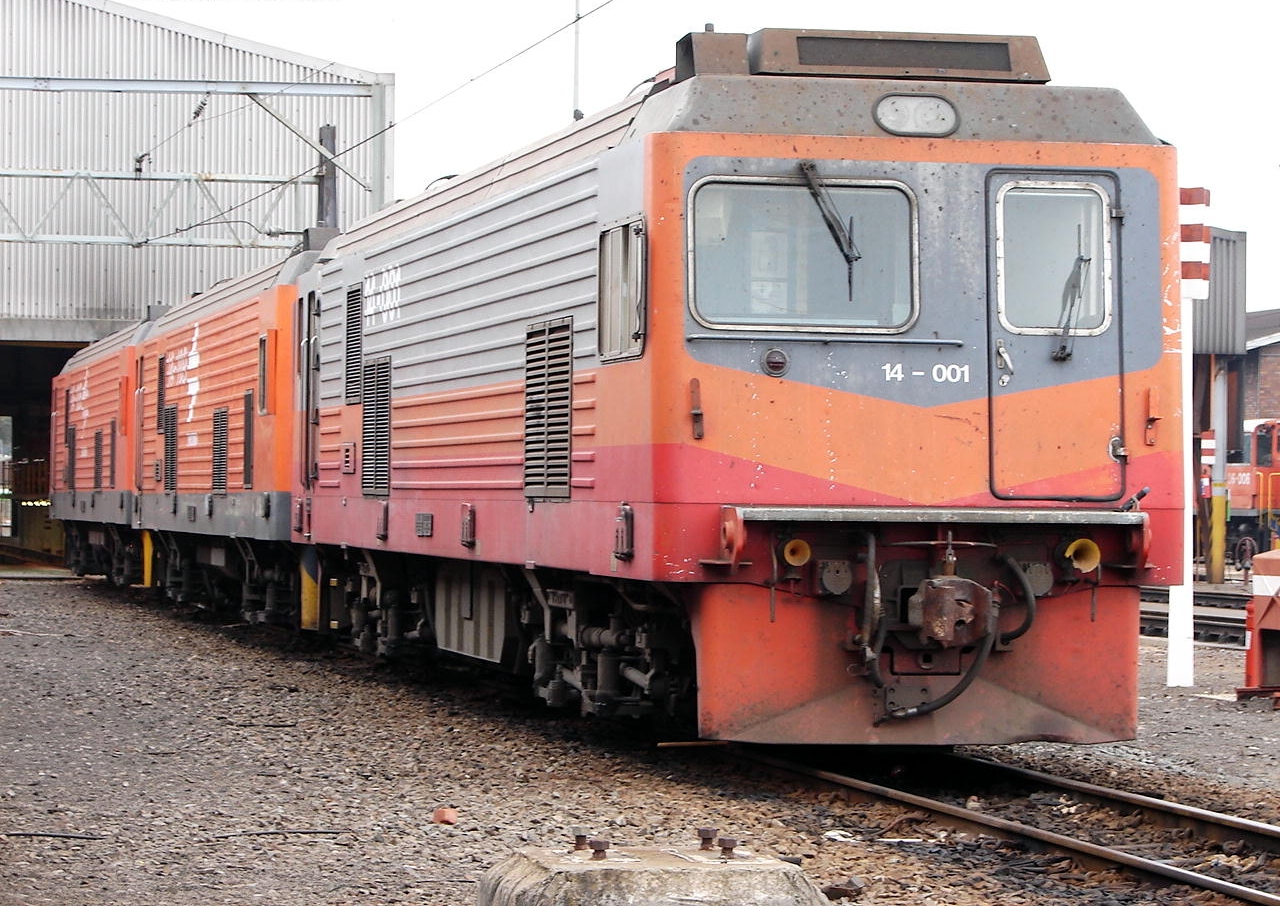
- No. 14-001 in its original livery at Bellville, 6 June 2010
Type and origin
- Power type: Electric
- Designer: 50 ^{c}/s Group
- Builder: Swiss Locomotive and Machine Works
- Serial number: 5415-5417
- Model: 50 ^{c}/s Group 14E
- Build date: 1988
- Total produced: 3
Specifications
- Configuration
  - AAR: B-B
  - UIC: Bo'Bo'
  - Commonwealth: Bo-Bo
- Gauge: 3 ft 6 in (1,067 mm)
- Wheel diameter: 1,250 mm (49.21 in) new 1,170 mm (46.06 in) worn
- Minimum curve: 85 m (278.87 ft) radius
- Wheelbase: 12,400 mm (40 ft 8 1/4 in)
  - Bogie: 3,100 mm (10 ft 2 in)
- Pivot centres: 9,300 mm (30 ft 6 1/8 in)
- Panto shoes: 8,800 mm (28 ft 10 1/2 in)
- Length
  - Over couplers: 18,500 mm (60 ft 8 3/8 in)
  - Over body: 17,400 mm (57 ft 1 in)
- Width: 2,973 mm (9 ft 9 in)
- Height
  - Pantograph: 4,120 mm (13 ft 6 1/4 in)
  - Body height: 4,047 mm (13 ft 3 3/8 in)
- Axle load: 23,125 kg (50,982 lb)
- Adhesive weight: 92,500 kg (203,900 lb)
- Loco weight: 92,500 kg (203,900 lb)
- Electric system/s: Dual 3 kV DC & 25 kV AC 50 Hz catenary
- Current pickup(s): Pantographs
- Traction motors: Four Siemens ITB2 820-OGA03
  - Continuous: 1,020 kW (1,370 hp)
- Gear ratio: 20:103
- Loco brake: Air, Regenerative on 3 kV DC & Rheostatic on 25 kV AC
- Train brakes: Air
- Couplers: AAR knuckle
Performance figures
- Maximum speed: 140 km/h (87 mph)
- Power output
  - Continuous: 4,080 kW (5,470 hp)
- Tractive effort
  - Starting: 300 kN (67,000 lbf)
  - 1 hour: 198 kN (45,000 lbf)
  - Continuous: 194 kN (44,000 lbf) & 72 km/h (45 mph)
Career
- Operators: Spoornet; Transnet Freight Rail
- Class: Class 14E
- Number in class: 3
- Numbers: 14-001 - 14-003
- Delivered: 1990
- First run: 1991
- Withdrawn: 2015

The Spoornet Class 14E of 1991 was a South African electric locomotive.

In 1990, Spoornet took delivery of three prototype Class 14E dual voltage electric mainline locomotives with a Bo-Bo wheel arrangement. They were the first dual voltage 3 kV DC and 25 kV AC locomotives to see service on South African rails when they were placed in service in 1991 and were followed in 1994 by ten locally manufactured Class 14E1 locomotives.

== Manufacturer ==
In January 1984, the South African Railways (SAR) invited tenders for six prototype Class 14E locomotives. These were required to be dual voltage 3 kV DC and 25 kV AC locomotives with self steering bogies and fully suspended AC traction motors, with a 3,800 kilowatts (5,100 horsepower) power output plus some 400 kilowatts (540 horsepower) to be available for train services such as heating. The maximum speed was to be at least 160 kilometres per hour (99 miles per hour) with a 22,000 kilograms (49,000 pounds) maximum axle loading.

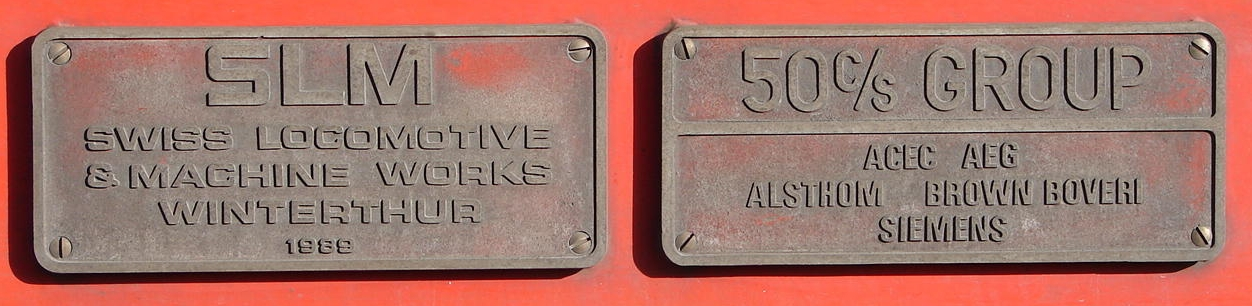
Builder's plates on no. 14-001

Only three prototype locomotives were eventually built and delivered in 1990. The 3 kV DC and 25 kV AC dual voltage Class 14E electric locomotive, the first dual voltage locomotive in South Africa, was designed by the 50 ^{c}/s Group consisting of SA Ateliers de Constructions Electriques de Charleroi (ACEC) of Belgium, AEG-Telefunken and Siemens of Germany, Alstom-Atlantique of France and Brown Boveri of Switzerland. They were built by Swiss Locomotive and Machine Works (SLM) in Winterthur.

== Characteristics ==
These dual cab locomotives had a roof access ladder on one side only, just to the right of the cab access door. The roof access ladder end was designated the no. 1 end. A corridor along the centre of the locomotive connected the cabs.

Unlike the later dual voltage Classes 19E, 20E and 21E which were equipped to automatically transition between AC and DC mode on the run, the Class 14E had to be stopped and then restarted under the different voltage. Upon their introduction in 1990, these were some of the most powerful electric locomotives on the Spoornet roster. They featured three-phase AC motors (induction motors) made by Siemens. In addition, they incorporated Siemens' sophisticated train communication network system.

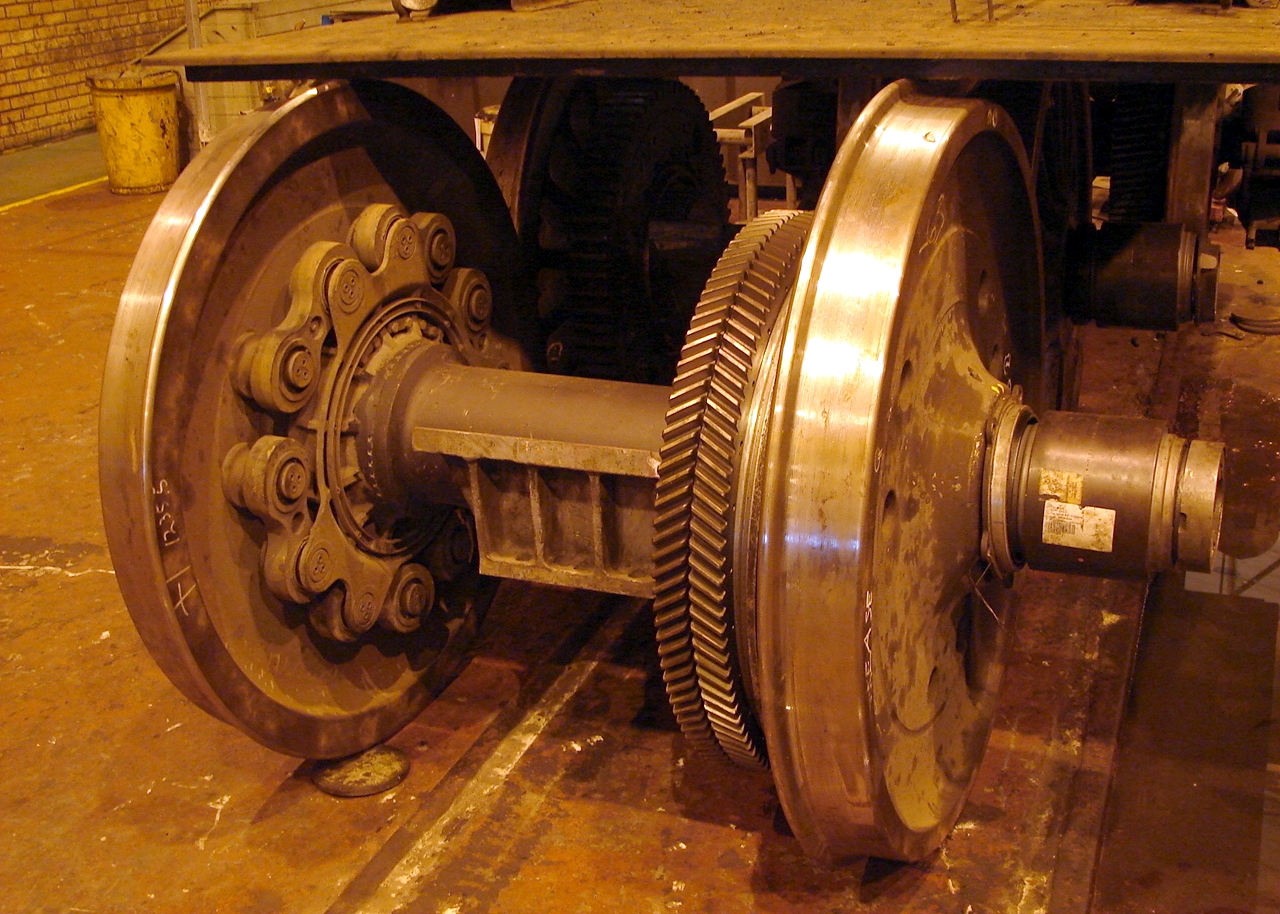
Class 14E wheelset with herringbone gear

All earlier South African electric locomotives, with the exception of the Orex Line's Class 9Es, ran on spoked wheels using spur gears. Amongst South African electric locomotives, the Class 14E was the first to have solid wheels with double helical or herringbone gears and with a traction motor to wheel gear ratio of 20:103. This gear ratio had the result that, while the three prototypes were very fast, they struggled to pick up a load. The locally built Class 14E1, on the other hand, ran on spoked wheels with helical gears and had a more conservative traction motor to wheel gear ratio of 18:67.

== Works numbers ==
On the Class 14E, the transformer serial numbers were engraved on a plate which depicted the circuit diagram of the transformer, mounted below the sill and halfway between the bogies on the roof access ladder side of the locomotive. These serial numbers do not follow the unit number sequence.

The respective SLM works numbers, transformer serial numbers, dates of delivery to Spoornet for testing and the dates placed in stock service are listed in the table.

Class 14E works numbers & dates in service
Loco No.	SLM no.	Transformer no.	Delivered	In service
14-001	5415	16657-1-3/1988	26 Jun 1990	26 Nov 1991
14-002	5416	16657-1-1/1988	9 Sep 1990	26 Nov 1991
14-003	5417	16657-1-2/1988	21 Sep 1990	26 Nov 1991

== Service ==
Class 14E locomotives initially entered service on the Reef, but from c. 2000 they were Bellville-based and were mainly employed in freight service on the route between Cape Town and Beaufort West in the Western Cape. Since they were dual voltage 3 kV DC and 25 kV AC locomotives, they could work on any electrified line country-wide with the exception of the 50 kV AC Sishen-Saldanha iron ore line. On occasion, the Class 14E locomotives were employed to haul the Blue Train all the way along the Cape Town-Pretoria route across the 25 kV AC stretch between Beaufort West and Kimberley, but this task was usually performed by selected Class 14E1 locomotives. After two incidents, in 2013 with Class 14E1 no. 14-104 and in 2014 with Class 14E no. 14-001 when the locomotives caught alight and were destroyed while hauling the Blue Train, the Class was replaced by Class 18E locomotives on Blue Train service.

In 1998, a number of Spoornet's electric locomotives and most of their Class 38-000 electro-diesel locomotives were sold to Maquarie-GETX (General Electric Financing) and leased back to Spoornet for a ten-year period, which was to expire in 2008. Of the Class 14E, numbers 14-002 and 14-003 were included in this leasing deal.

== Disposal ==
None of the three units were preserved.

- No. 14-001 burnt out while working the Blue Train near Kimberley in February 2014. The hulk remained at Kimberley and was sold without bogies during an auction on 17 July 2014.
- No. 14-002 was sold at Bellville complete with bogies during an auction on 15 July 2015, along with Class 14E1 no. 14-105.
- No. 14-003 was used as a source of spare parts for its two sister units at Bellville for years and was eventually sold without bogies during an auction on 14 February 2014.

== Illustration ==
Class 14E locomotives were all painted in an orange, grey and red livery unique to them. The Spoornet emblem on the sides with the name "SPOORNET" below the emblem, as displayed in the main picture, was only applied on no. 14-002 at the same time that its red lower sides were repainted to orange lower sides and dark grey sills, probably during repairs or a major overhaul. Only no. 14-001 survived in service long enough to receive the new Blue Train livery in 2012.

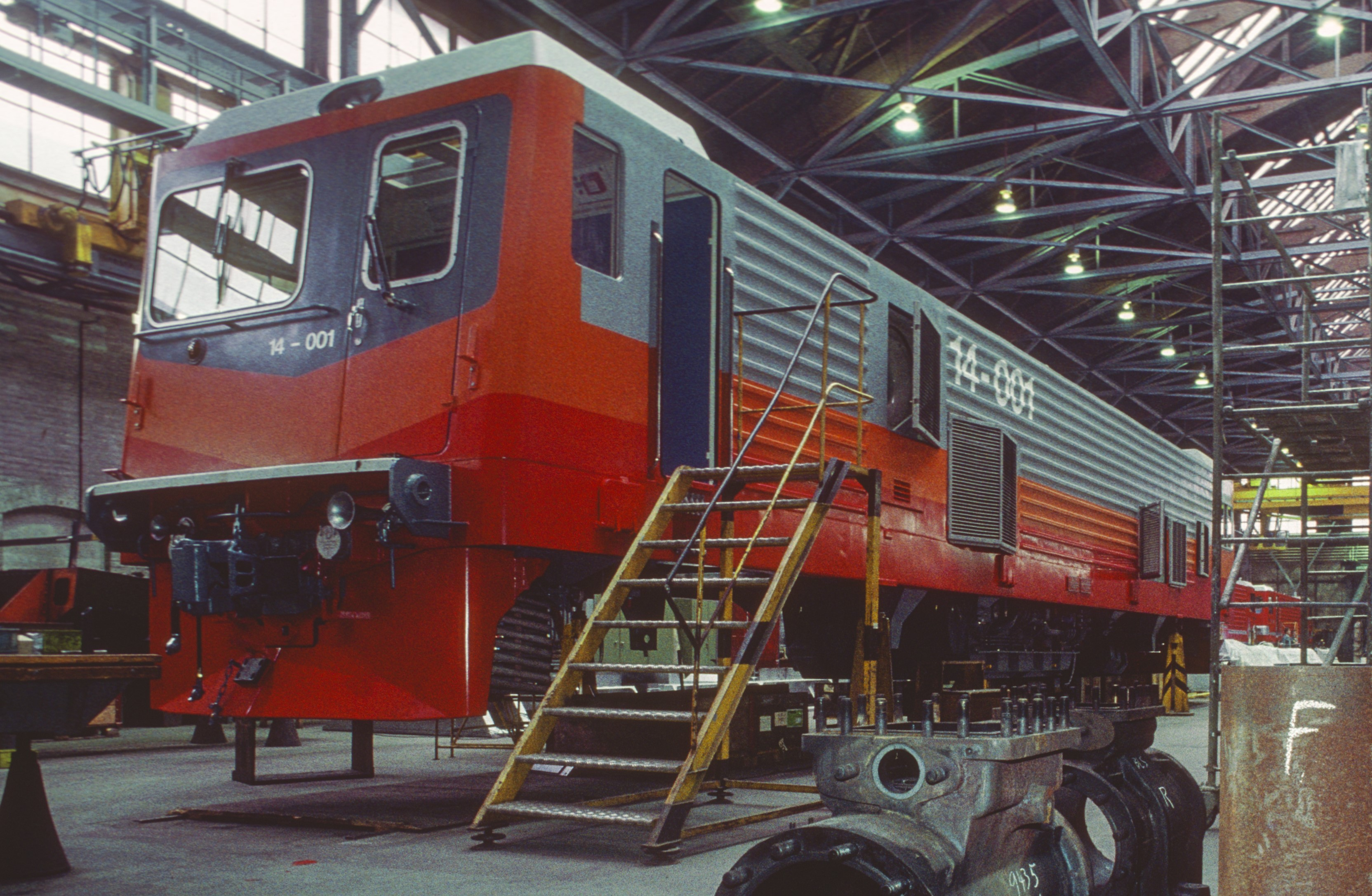
No. 14-001 in final assembly hall of SLM in Winterthur

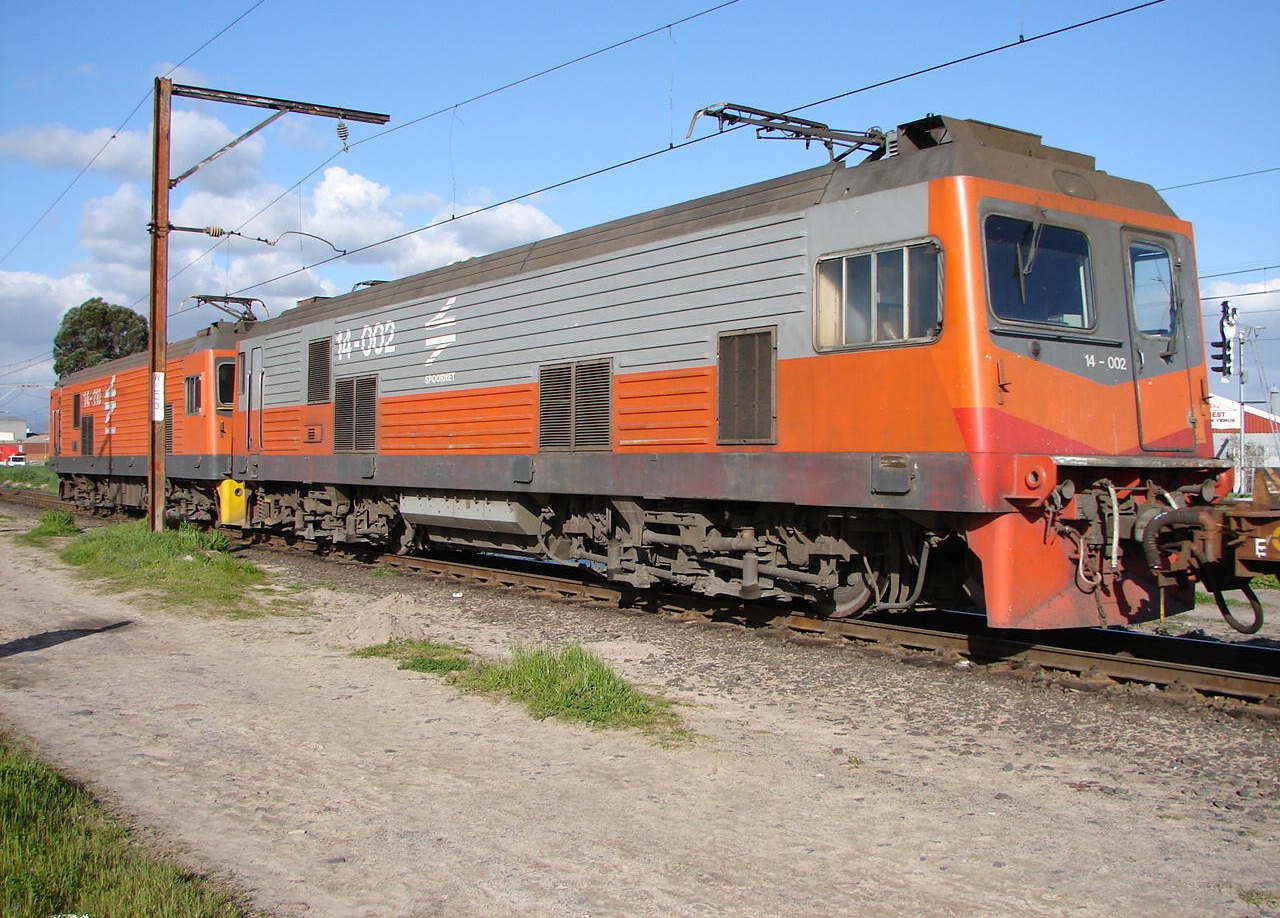
No. 14-002 on a goods train at Stikland, Cape Town, 15 August 2006

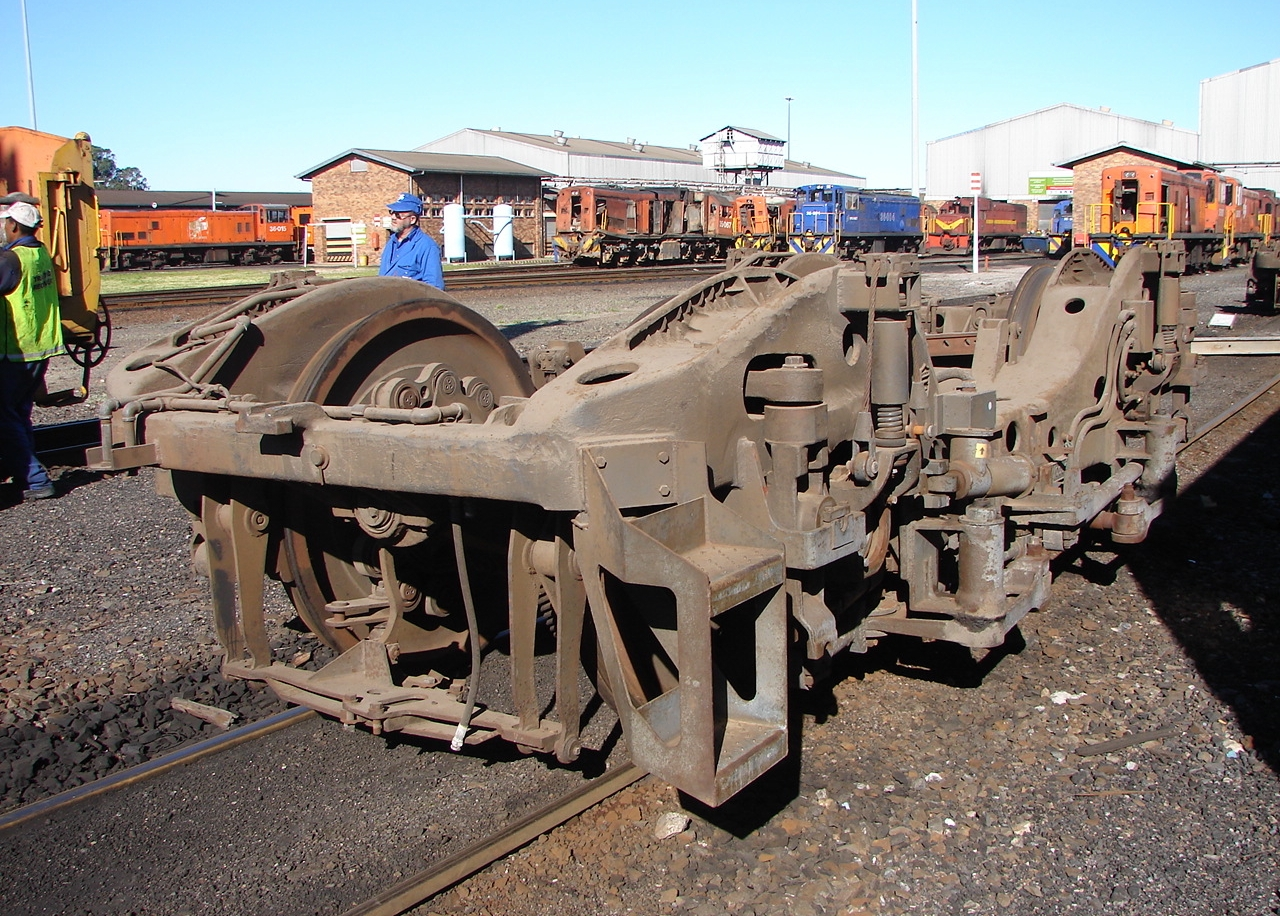
Class 14E bogie off no. 14-003, Bellville, Cape Town, 27 June 2009

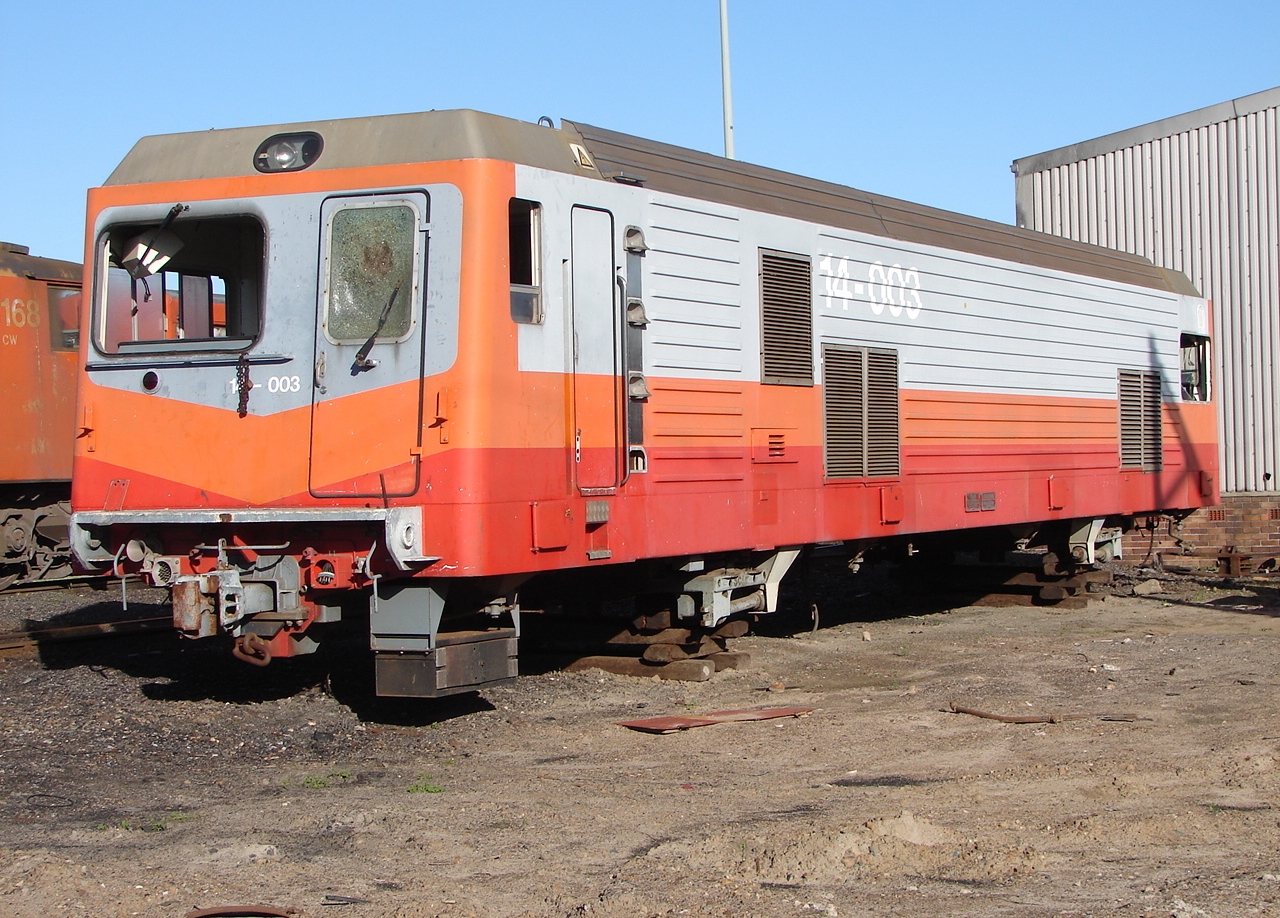
No. 14-003 without bogies, parked on rail sleepers at Bellville Depot, 18 July 2009

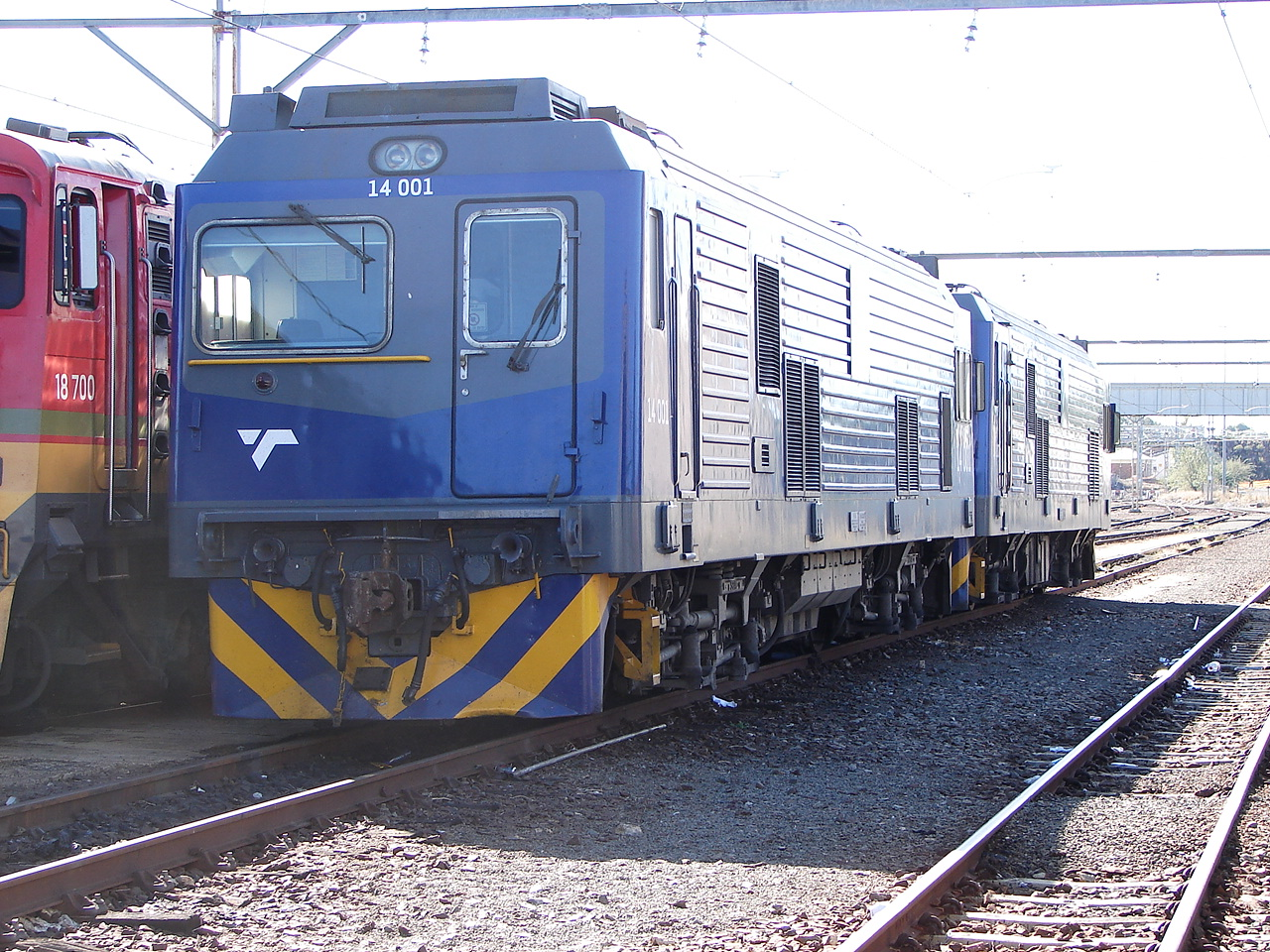
No. 14-001 in Blue Train livery at Beaufort West, Western Cape, 9 May 2013
