= South African Class 20E =

South African electric locomotive

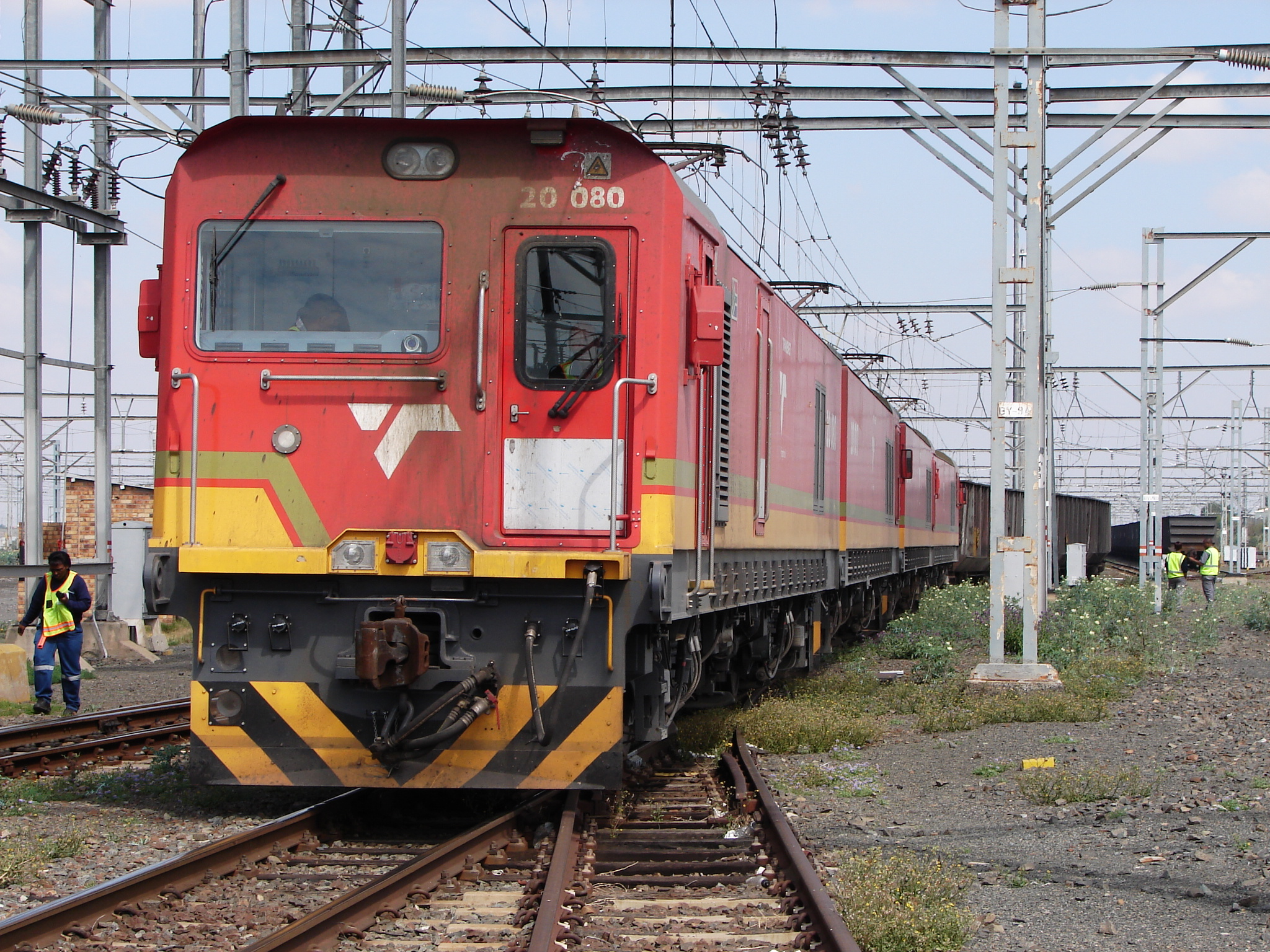
- No. 20-080 at Beaufort West, Western Cape, 16 September 2015
Type and origin
- Power type: Electric
- Designer: Zhuzhou Electric Locomotive Co.
- Builder: Zhuzhou Electric Locomotive Co. CSR Zhuzhou-Matsetse Basadi
- Model: ZELC 20E
- Build date: 2013–2015
- Total produced: 95
Specifications
- Configuration
  - AAR: B-B
  - UIC: Bo'Bo'
  - Commonwealth: Bo-Bo
- Gauge: 3 ft 6 in (1,067 mm) Cape gauge
- Wheel diameter: 1,220 mm (48.0 in)
- Wheelbase
  - Bogie: 2,700 mm (8 ft 10.3 in)
- Length
  - Over couplers: 18,268 mm (59 ft 11.2 in)
- Width: 2,950 mm (9 ft 8.1 in)
- Height
  - Pantograph: 3,850 mm (12 ft 7.6 in)
- Axle load: 21,870 kg (48,220 lb)
- Loco weight: 86,368 kg (190,409 lb)
- Electric system/s: Dual 3 kV DC & 25 kV AC 50 Hz catenary
- Current pickup: Pantographs
- Traction motors: Four
- Gear ratio: 103:17
- MU working: 8 units
- Loco brake: Electro-pneumatic, regenerative & rheostatic
- Train brakes: Air
- Couplers: AAR knuckle
Performance figures
- Maximum speed: 100 km/h (62 mph)
- Power output: 3,000 kW (4,000 hp)
- Tractive effort
  - Starting: 320 kN (72,000 lbf)
  - Continuous: 270 kN (61,000 lbf)
- Brakeforce: 250 kN (56,000 lbf)
Career
- Operators: Transnet Freight Rail
- Class: 20E
- Number in class: 95
- Numbers: 20-001 to 20-095
- Official name: Class 20E
- Nicknames: China Doll
- Delivered: 2013–2015
- First run: 2013

The Transnet Freight Rail Class 20E of 2013 is a South African electric locomotive.

In early August 2013, the first of ninety-five Class 20E dual-voltage electric locomotives for Transnet Freight Rail, was lowered onto its bogies for the first time. Ten of these locomotives were built by the Zhuzhou Electric Locomotive Company in China while the rest were built locally.

== Manufacturer ==
The first ten of ninety-five 3 kV DC and 25 kV AC dual voltage Class 20E electric locomotives for Transnet Freight Rail were built in China by Zhuzhou Electric Locomotive Company, a subsidiary of the China South Locomotive and Rolling Stock Corporation (CSR), China's leading train manufacturer. The roll-out ceremony of the first locomotive, no. 20-001, took place at the factory in Changsha in central China's Hunan Province on 20 August 2013.

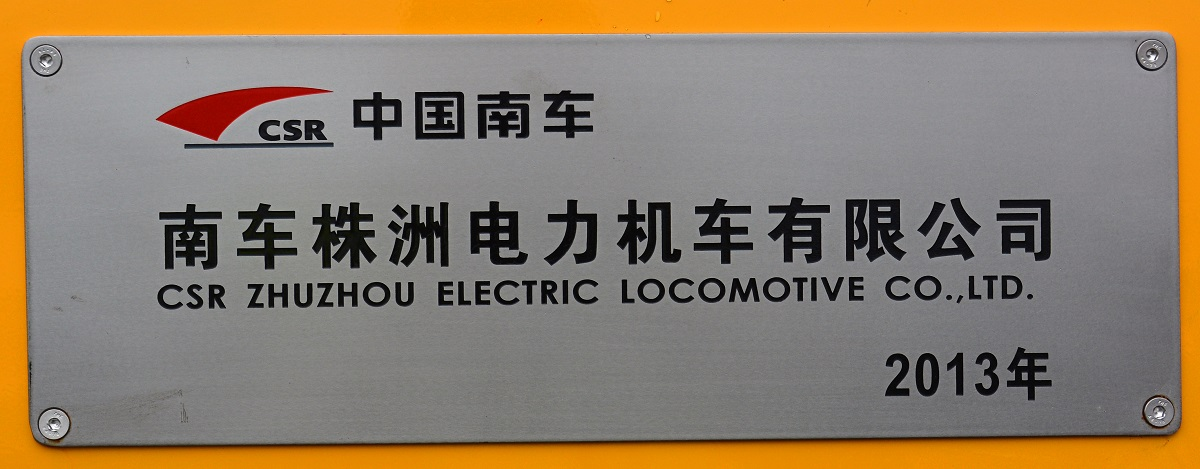

The contract marked Zhuzhou's largest single foreign order of electric locomotives to date and made provision for the company to export electric locomotive manufacturing technologies to South Africa to enable a local production ratio of more than 60 percent. The first two of these locomotives, numbers 20-002 and 20-003, were landed at Durban Harbour on 14 November 2013. Three more, numbers 20-001, 20-004 and 20-005, came ashore on 18 December 2013.

Of the remaining eighty-five locomotives, numbers 20-011 to 20-025 were assembled from Chinese-built kits by Transnet Engineering at Koedoespoort and were all in service by the end of September 2014.

The rest of the order has greater local content and was built at Koedoespoort in South Africa by a consortium composed of CSR Zhuzhou and the South African Black Economic Empowerment company Matsetse Basadi. The first of these, no. 20-026, was in service by late September 2014.

== Characteristics ==
The locomotive body is a welded monocoque design, constructed of steel plates and profiled members which has a compressive strength of 4.45 meganewtons (1,000,000 pounds-force) and a tensile strength of 4 meganewtons (900,000 pounds-force).

The Class 20E is equipped with a wireless data transmission system which can send the locomotive operation status, fault data and energy consumption data via GSM and Wi-Fi to a trackside station for analysis. It is also equipped with an axle temperature alarm device, fire alarm system, closed-circuit television (CCTV) system, wheel flange lubricating device and, as personnel safety measure, high voltage protective interlocking devices. The AC traction motors are powered through insulated-gate bipolar transistor (IGBT) control.

=== Layout ===
The locomotive has a single cab and a gangway along the centre, while the interior layout and placement of equipment is as follows, from behind the cab towards the rear:

Left side

- Air conditioner.
- Low voltage cubicle.
- Battery cubicle.
- Service entrance portal and door.
- Traction converter cubicle 1.
- Cooling tower 1.
- Power supply cubicle.
- Traction motor blower 2.
- Braking resistor.
- Toilet, with a porta-potty and hand washbasin.

Right side

- Signal cubicle.
- Traction motor blower 1.
- Machine ventilation blower.
- Cooling tower 2.
- Traction converter cubicle 2.
- High voltage cubicle.
- Main compressor.
- Brake cubicle.

Underbelly between bogies

- Main transformer.
- Two auxiliary transformers.

=== Dual voltage ===
As on the dual voltage Class 19E, the main electric circuit is automatically selected in either AC or DC mode, based on the voltage of the overhead contact wire feeding the locomotive. To facilitate automatic trouble-free transition on the run, the locomotive is equipped with onboard voltage detectors, while the overhead wire is equipped with two wooden isolators and a 3 metres (10 feet) length of neutral wire to separate the AC and DC feed. The neutral section is connected to the rails which serve as the return conductor on electrified lines.

The transition process requires that the locomotive should automatically be switched off before it reaches the isolators and the unpowered overhead wire section, and automatically be restarted after exiting from under the unpowered wire. This is done by a pair of track magnets, one on either side of the neutral overhead wire and spaced 45 metres (148 feet) apart. The two magnets are mounted with their polarities reversed in relation to each other and they activate a magnetic relay located behind the cowcatcher of the locomotive to do the switching off and restarting.

Under 25 kV AC/50 Hz line voltage, the electric system is designed to operate at a maximum of 31 kV and a minimum of 17 kV, while under 3 kV DC it is designed to operate at a maximum of 4 kV and a minimum of 2 kV.

=== Mixed power ===
The locomotive has regenerative and rheostatic braking, a maximum speed of 100 km/h and is equipped with low-speed controls. Using radio frequency distributed power (RFDP) technology, the units are able to work mid-train in lengthy wagon consists.

A Class 20E unit can also be used as the leading locomotive in multi-unit operation with diesel-electric locomotives.

=== Pantographs ===
Transnet Freight Rail insisted that the locomotive should be designed in such a way that the pantograph contact shoe centres are directly above the bogie pivot centres, as was done on the Class 7E and Class 7E2, Series 1 and Series 2. The reason is to reduce the possibility of pantograph hookups on catenary in sharp curves, such as in turnouts, as a result of sideways movement of the pantograph in relation to the overhead wire.

== Service ==
Following testing, the first of the Chinese-built locomotives entered service in March 2014, working on the manganese ore line between Hotazel in the Northern Cape and Port Elizabeth in the Eastern Cape via Kimberley, De Aar and Noupoort.

Two class 20E units, numbers 20-031 and 20-032, were selected to be used on the Blue Train and were painted in blue livery. In Blue Train service they replaced the previously used Class 18Es on the DC lines, the Class 7Es on the AC lines and the Classes 14E and 14E1 country-wide early in 2015. The Classes 14E and 14E1 were withdrawn from service shortly before.

== Illustration ==
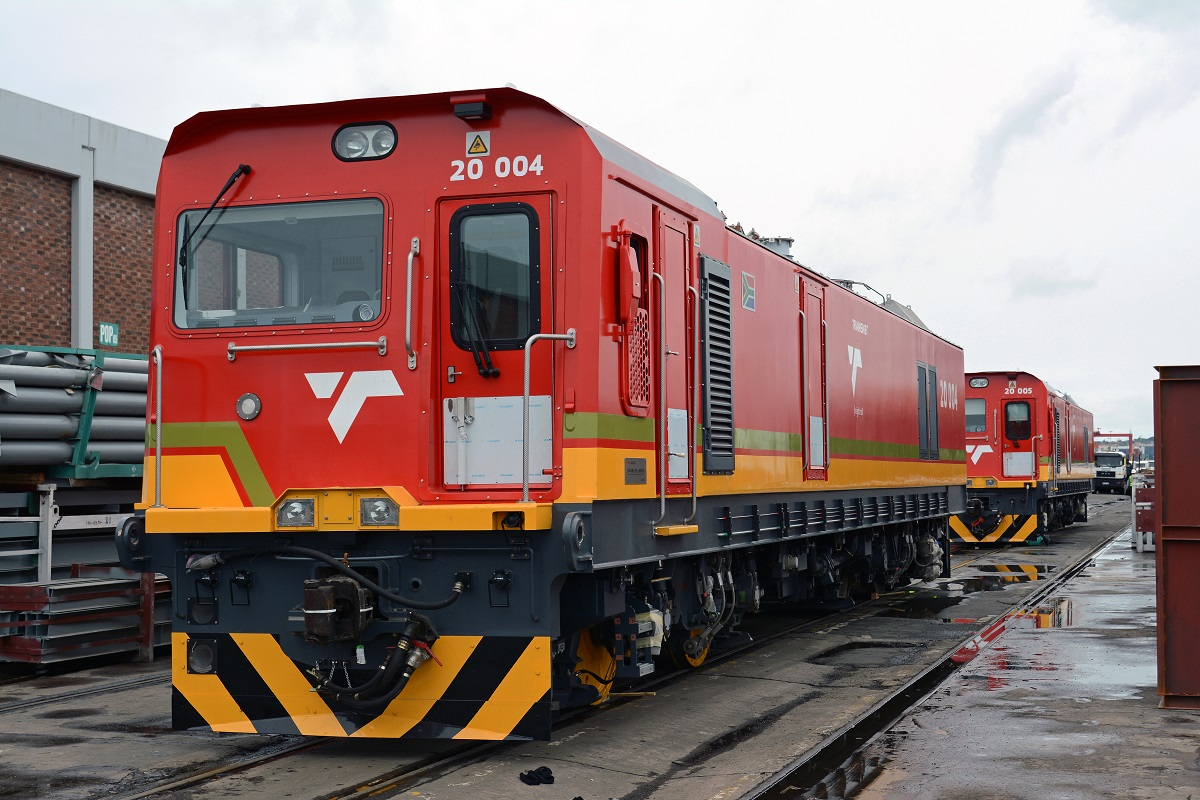
No. 20–004 at O Shed in Durban Harbour on 18 December 2013

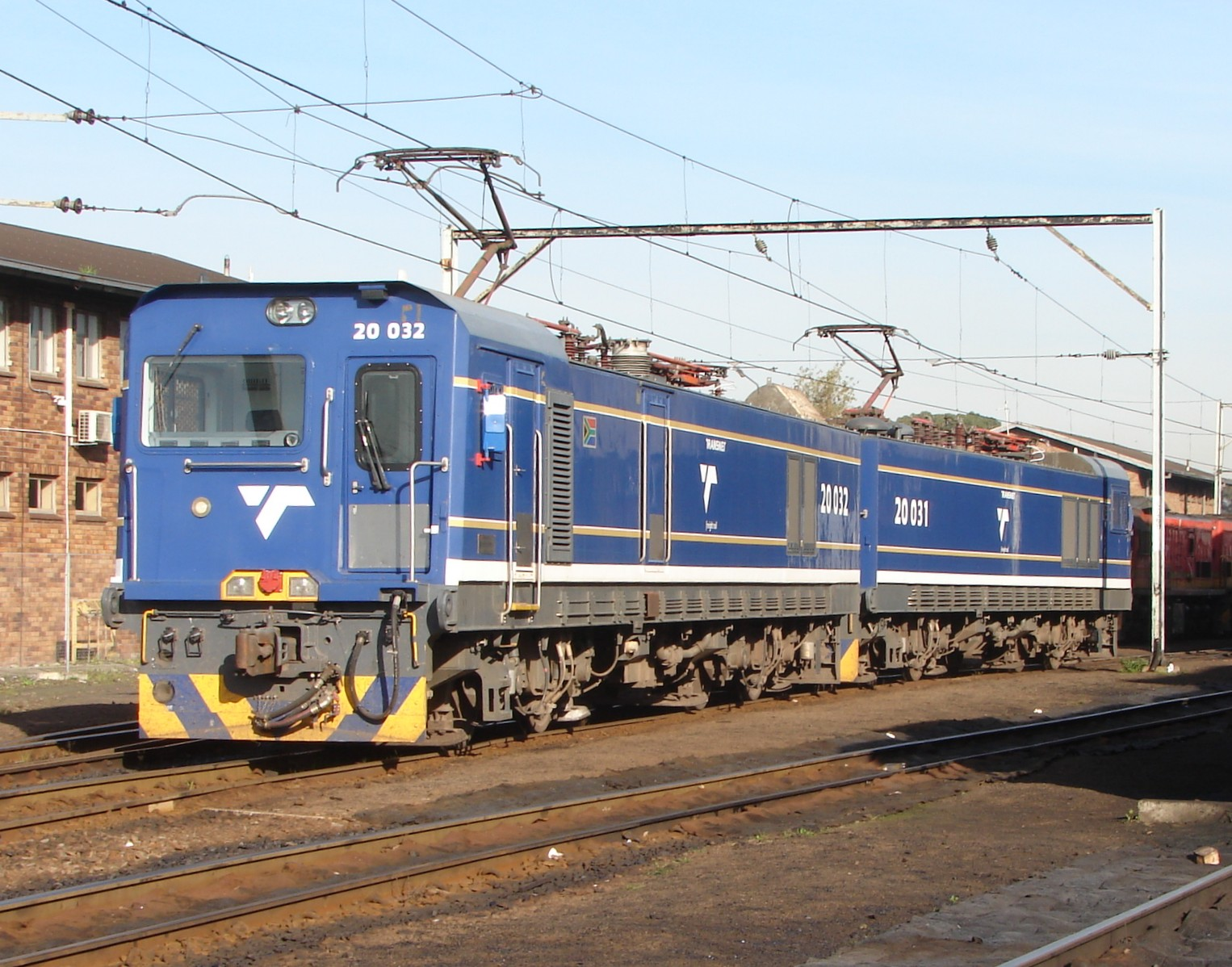
Blue Train units 20-032 and 20-031, Bellville, 4 July 2017

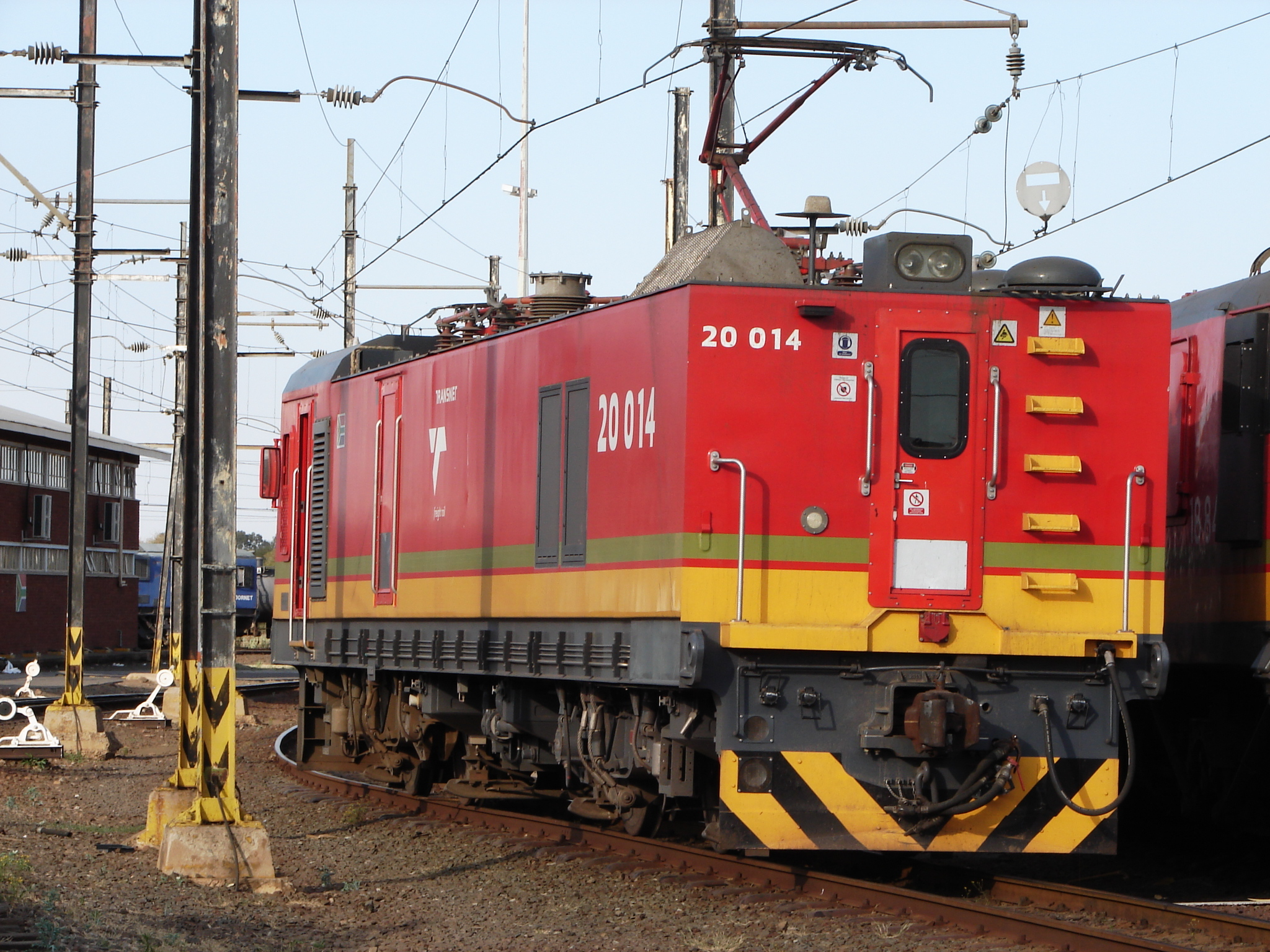
No. 20–014 at Beaconsfield, Kimberley on 7 October 2015

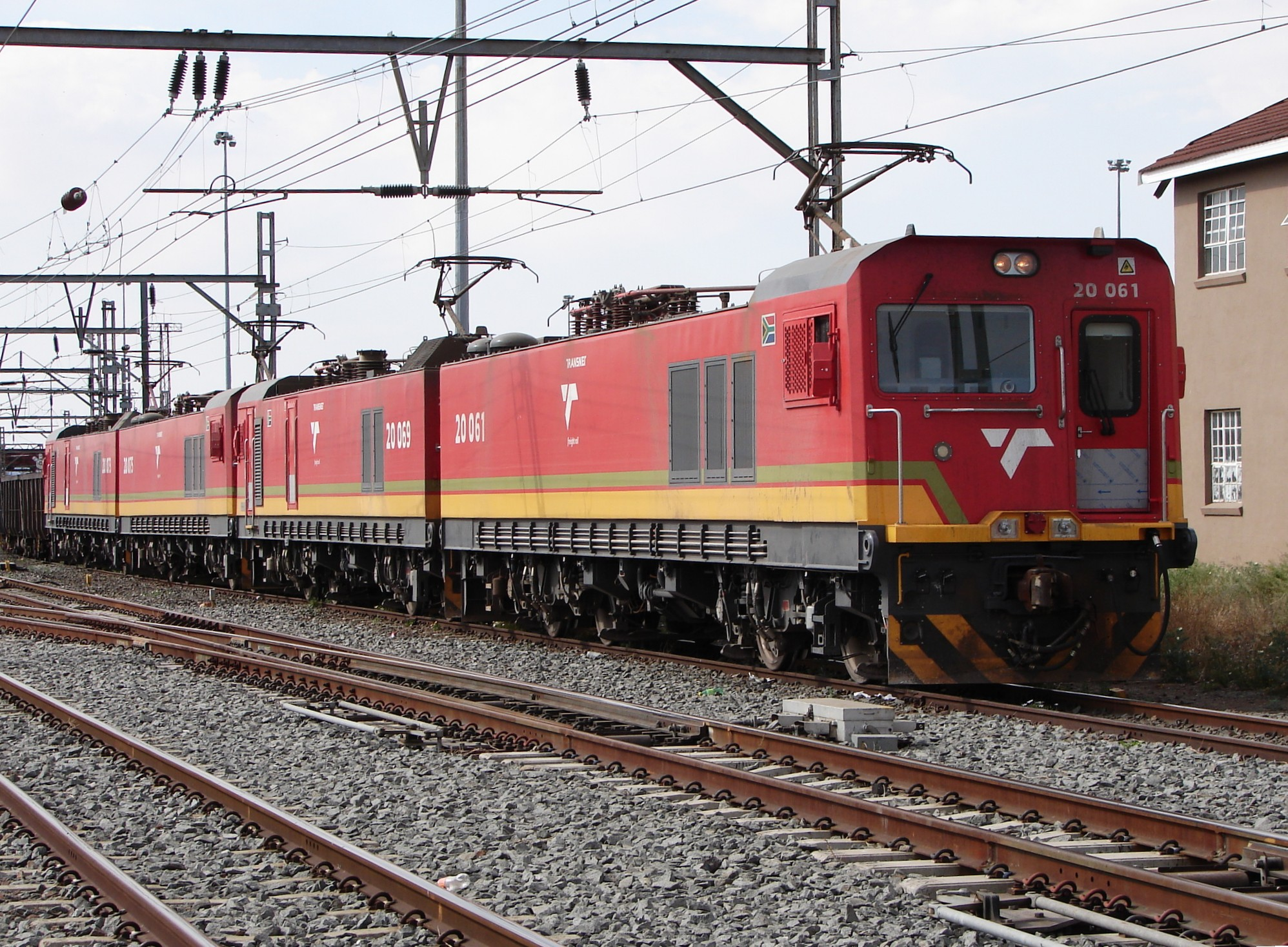
No. 20–061 at De Aar, Northern Cape on 9 October 2015
