= South African Class 21E =

South African electric locomotive

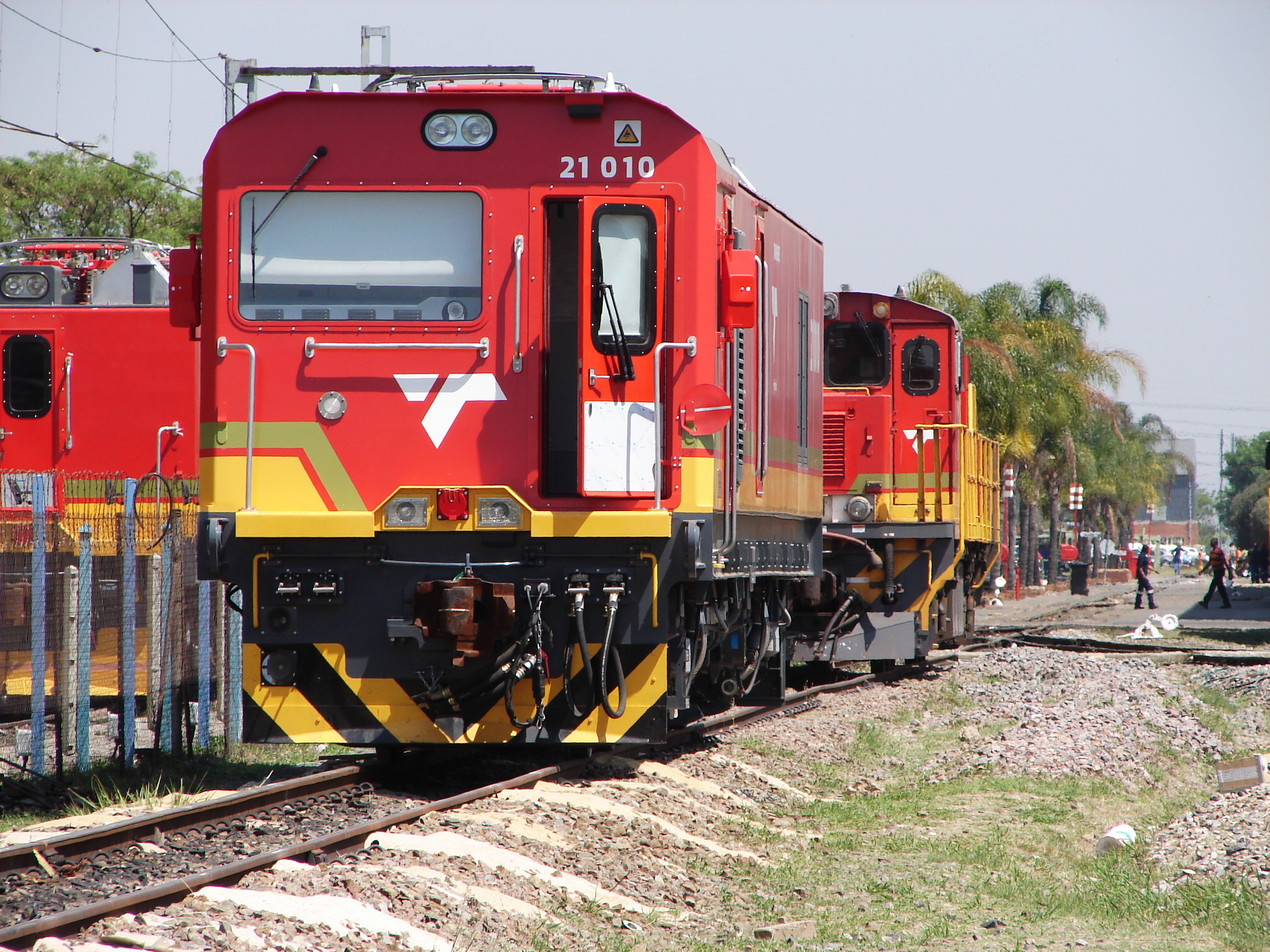
- No. 21-010 at Koedoespoort, 29 September 2015
Type and origin
- Power type: Electric
- Designer: Zhuzhou Electric Locomotive Co.
- Builder: Zhuzhou Electric Locomotive Co. Transnet Engineering
- Model: ZELC 21E
- Build date: 2014-2015
- Total produced: 100
Specifications
- Configuration
  - AAR: B-B
  - UIC: Bo'Bo'
  - Commonwealth: Bo-Bo
- Gauge: 3 ft 6 in (1,067 mm) Cape gauge
- Axle load: 26,000 kg (57,000 lb)
- Electric system/s: Dual 3 kV DC & 25 kV AC/50 Hz catenary
- Current pickup: Pantographs
- Traction motors: Four
- MU working: 8 units
- Loco brake: Electro-pneumatic, regenerative & rheostatic
- Train brakes: Air
- Couplers: AAR knuckle Type F
Performance figures
- Maximum speed: 100 km/h (62 mph)
- Power output: 3,000 kW (4,000 hp)
Career
- Operators: Transnet Freight Rail
- Class: 21E
- Number in class: 100
- Numbers: 21-001 to 21-100
- Delivered: 2014-2015
- First run: 2014

The Transnet Freight Rail Class 21E of 2014 is a South African electric locomotive.

On 16 September 2014, the first of the Class 21E dual voltage electric locomotives for Transnet Freight Rail was rolled out at the CSR Zhuzhou Electric Locomotive Company in China. Two of these locomotives were built in China with another 38 to follow, while the rest were built in South Africa.

== Manufacturer ==
The first forty of the one hundred 3 kV DC and 25 kV AC dual voltage Class 21E electric locomotives for Transnet Freight Rail were built in China by Zhuzhou Electric Locomotive Company, a subsidiary of the China South Locomotive and Rolling Stock Corporation (CSR), China's leading train manufacturer.

The roll-out ceremony of the first locomotive, no. 21-001, took place at the factory on 16 September 2014. The remaining sixty locomotives of the order were built in South Africa.

According to the project plan, the agreement also included the joint production of more electric locomotives, electric multiple units, suburban rail vehicles and rail transportation equipment for South Africa and the African region.

The first two locomotives were delivered for acceptance trials on 11 December 2014. They came ashore at Maydon Wharf in Durban and were moved dead in tow to Pyramid South Depot, north of Pretoria, the following day. No. 21-002 was equipped with load-measuring-wheelsets, painted yellow, on its front bogie.

== Characteristics ==
The Class 21E is virtually identical in visual appearance to the earlier Class 20E locomotive, which was described by the manufacturer as the "promotion version" of the Class 21E. It is, in essence, an upgraded version of the Class 20E based on customer requirements. It is a heavier locomotive, with the axle load increased to 26,000 kilograms (57,000 pounds) and with improved tractive effort to make it more suitable for service on the Coalink line. It makes use of more advanced electronically controlled pneumatic (ECP) brake system technology to control the train's air brakes through electrical signals, which improves the train's braking response time and results in improved safety and reliability. The four-axle locomotive is capable of an output of 3,000 kilowatts (4,000 horsepower) and a speed of 100 kilometres per hour (62 miles per hour). Its microcomputer network control system allows eight of these locomotives to work together in a multi-unit consist and also to work consisted to diesel-electric locomotives.

The only externally visible differences between the Classes 20E and 21E are on the end sills, buffer beams, cowcatchers and the left side of the cab roof.

- The Class 20E has two cable sockets on each side of the coupler and a fifth socket in a cut-out on the sill, below the front door on the front sill and in the same position on the rear sill, near the right end of the sill. The Class 21E has no such cut-out in the sill. The radio frequency distributed power (RFDP) conjunction boxes are mounted below the sockets to the right hand side of the coupler.
- The Class 21E has a small rectangular grille near the rear end of the left side of the cab roof, above the large grilled hatch door to the right of the cab door on the left side. This small grille is absent on the Class 20E.

=== Layout ===
The locomotive body is a welded monocoque design, constructed of steel plates and profiled members, which has a compressive strength of 4.45 meganewtons (1,000,000 pounds-force) and a tensile strength of 4 meganewtons (900,000 pounds-force). The Class 21E has a single cab and a gangway along the centre of the locomotive. It is equipped with a wireless data transmission system which can send the locomotive operation status, fault data and energy consumption data via GSM and Wi-Fi to a trackside station for analysis. It is also equipped with an axle temperature alarm device, fire alarm system, closed-circuit television (CCTV) system, wheel flange lubricating device and, as personnel safety measure, high voltage protective interlocking devices. The AC traction motors are powered through insulated-gate bipolar transistor (IGBT) control.

=== Dual voltage ===
As on the dual voltage Classes 19E and 20E, the main electric circuit is automatically selected in either AC or DC mode, based on the voltage of the overhead contact wire feeding the locomotive. To facilitate automatic trouble-free transition on the run, the locomotive is equipped with onboard voltage detectors, while the overhead wire is equipped with two wooden isolators and a 3 metres (10 feet) length of neutral wire to separate the AC and DC feeds. The neutral section is connected to the rails, which serve as the return conductor on electrified lines.

The transition process requires that the locomotive should automatically be switched off before it reaches the isolators and the unpowered overhead wire section, and automatically be restarted after exiting from under the unpowered wire. This is done by a pair of track magnets, one on either side of the neutral overhead wire and spaced 45 metres (148 feet) apart. The two magnets are mounted with their polarities reversed in relation to each other and they activate a magnetic relay located behind the cowcatcher of the locomotive to do the switching off and restarting.

=== Pantographs ===
Transnet Freight Rail insisted that the locomotive must be designed in such a way that the pantograph contact shoe centres are directly above the bogie pivot centres, as was done on the Class 7E and Class 7E2, Series 1 and Series 2 and again on the Class 20E. The reason is to reduce the possibility of pantograph hookups on catenary in sharp curves, such as in turnouts, as a result of sideways movement of the pantograph in relation to the overhead wire.

== Service ==
The Class 21E was placed in service on the 25 kV AC Coalink line between Ermelo and the Richards Bay Coal Terminal. They work directly from the coal mines around Ermelo, running under 3 kV DC catenary. The dual voltage Class 21E locomotives can therefore haul their loads directly from the mines all the way to Richards Bay without having to change locomotives in Ermelo to cater for the change in the power supply.

== Illustration ==
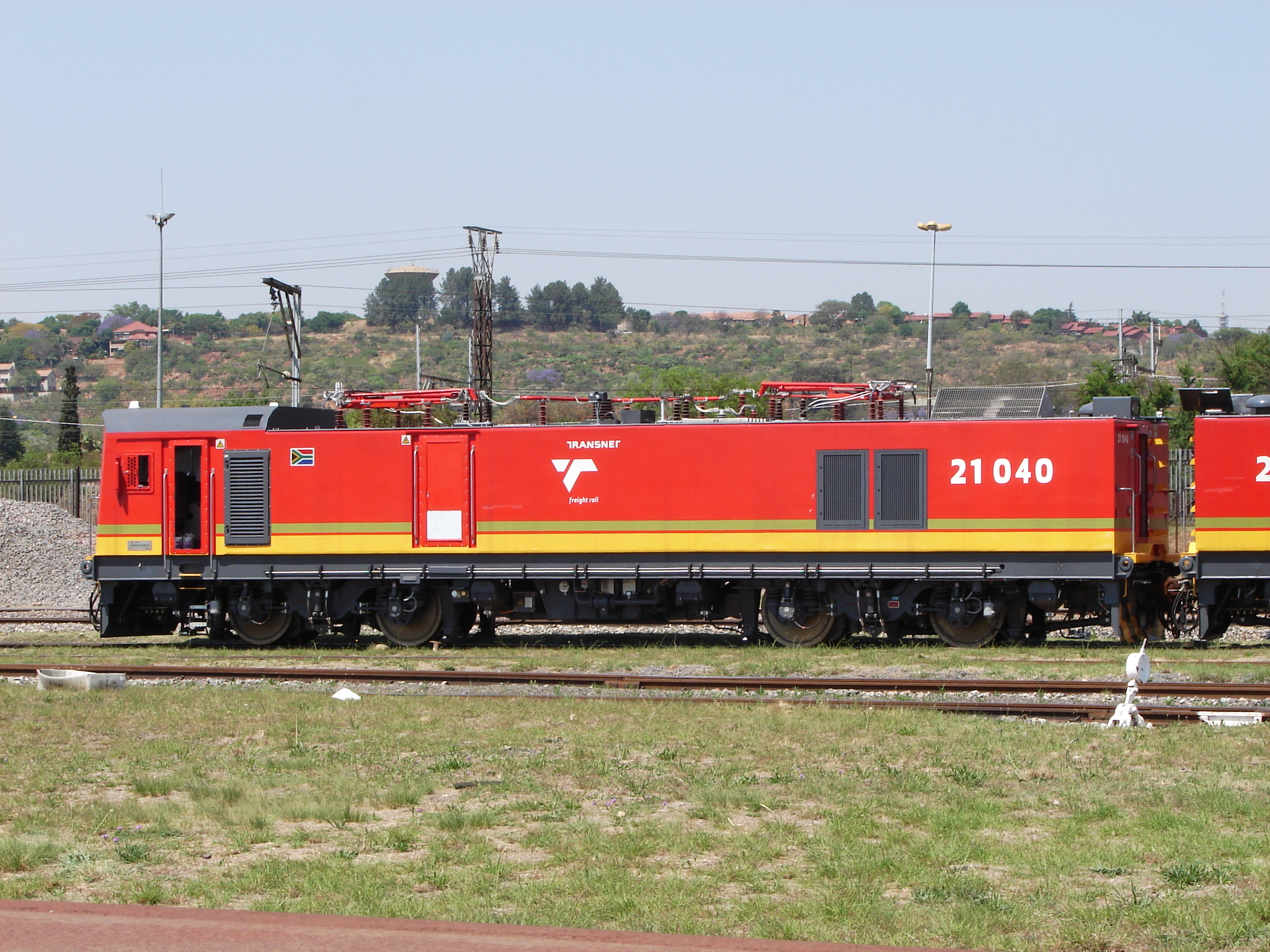
No. 21-040 at Koedoespoort, Pretoria on 29 September 2015

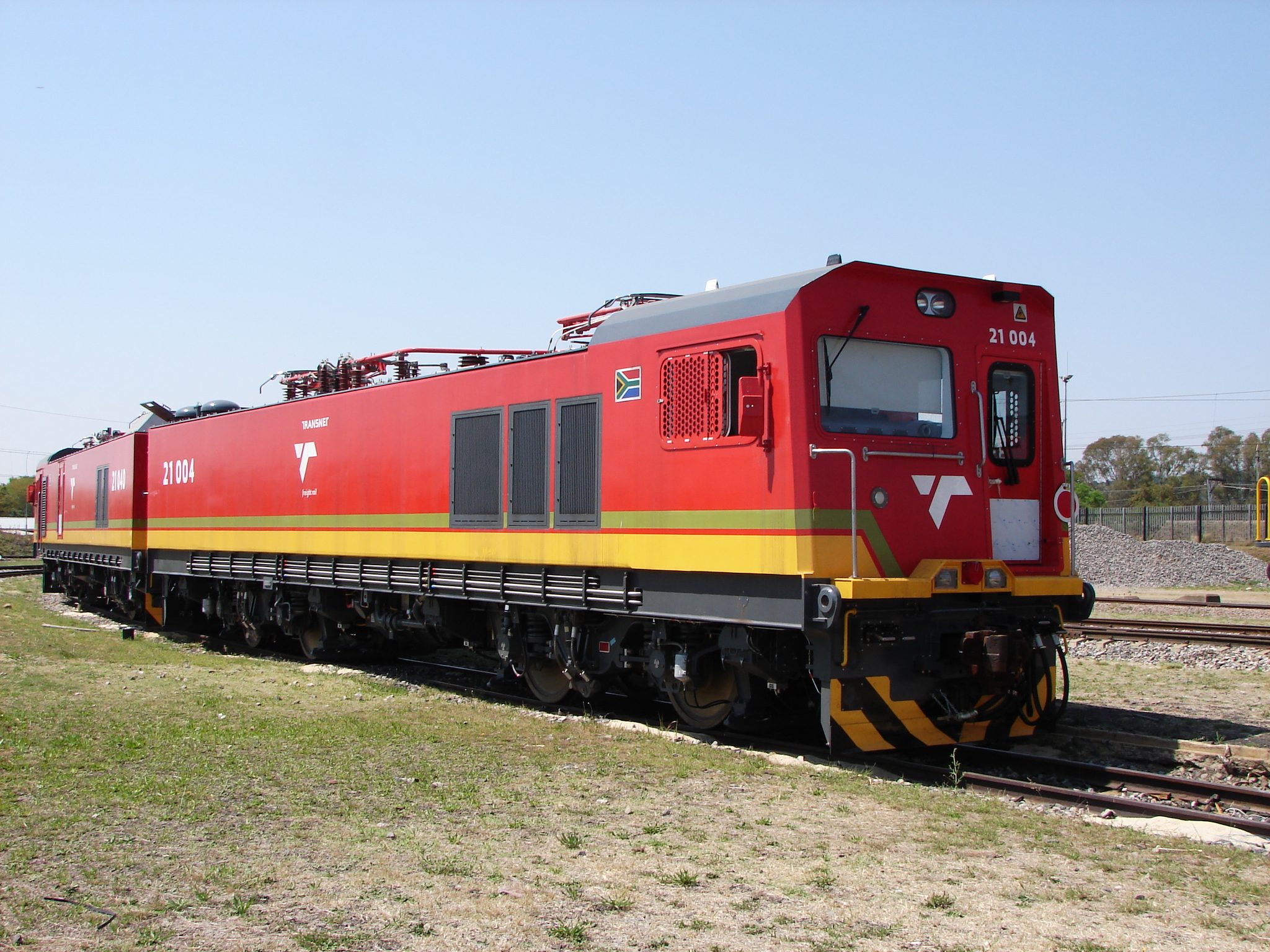
No. 21-004 at Koedoespoort, Pretoria on 29 September 2015

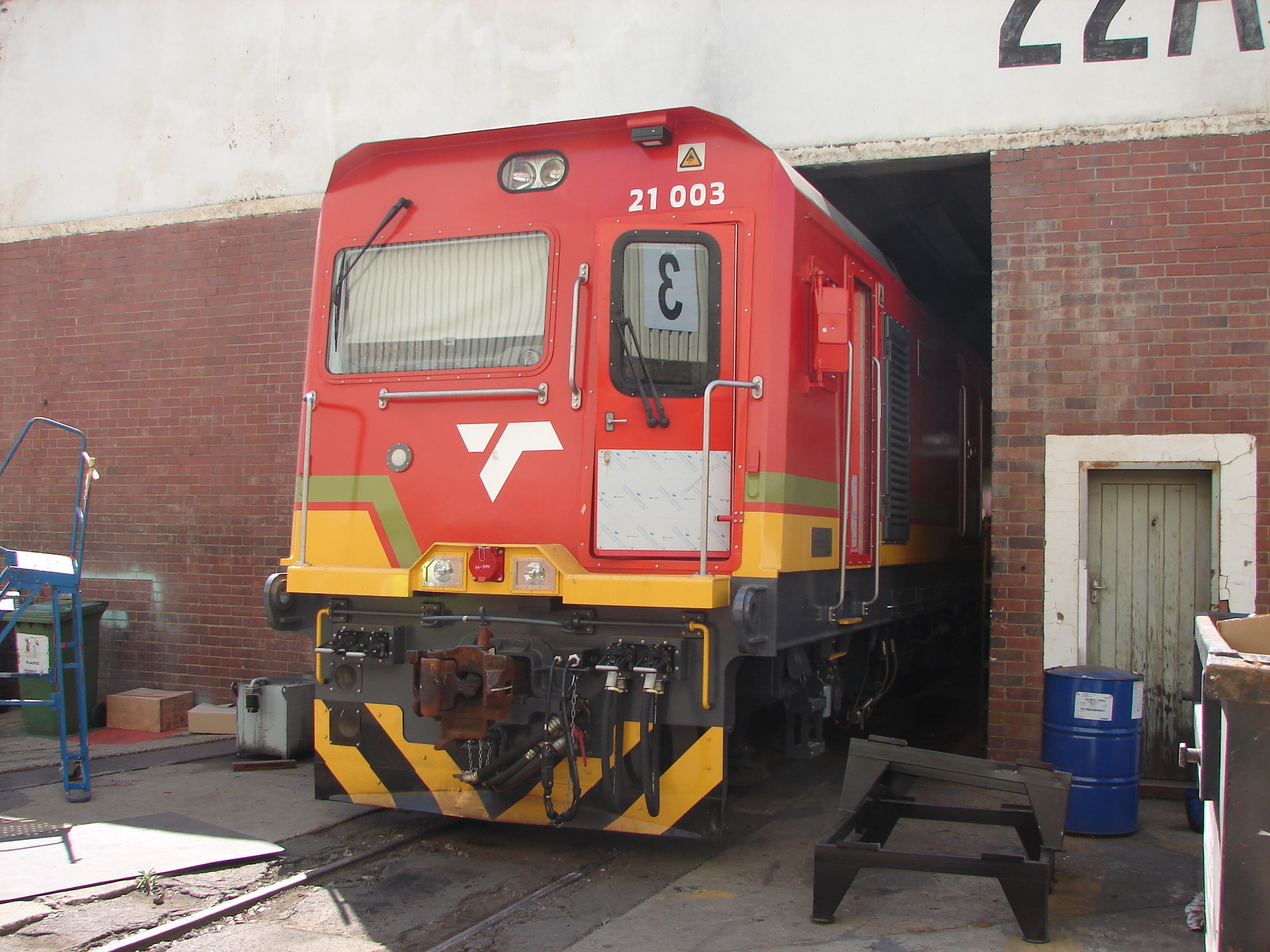
No. 21-003 at Koedoespoort, Pretoria on 29 September 2015

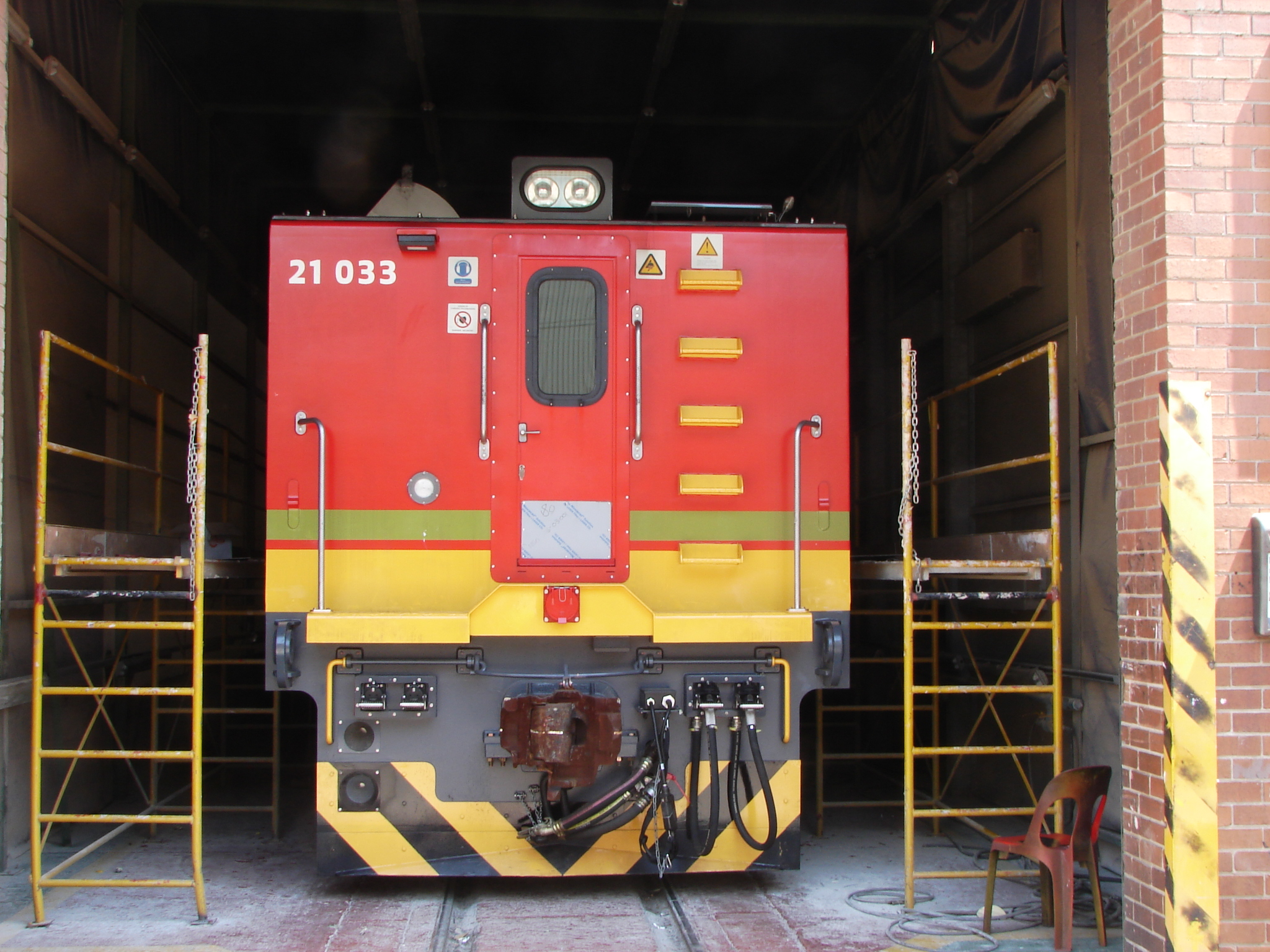
No. 21-033 at Koedoespoort, Pretoria on 29 September 2015
