= South African Class 7E2, Series 2 =

Class of 40 South African electric locomotives

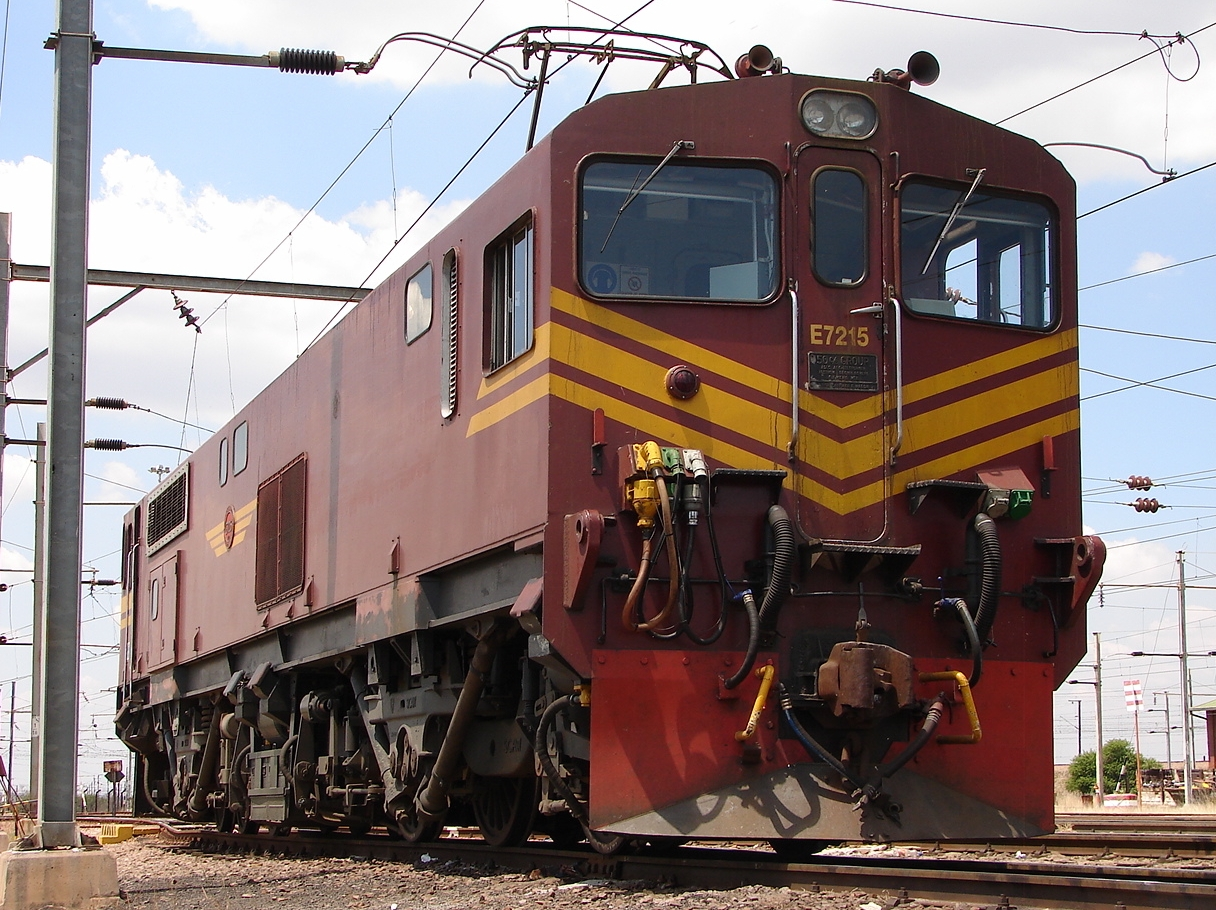
- E7215 at Pyramid South, Pretoria in October 2009
Type and origin
- Power type: Electric
- Designer: 50 ^{c}/s Group
- Builder: Union Carriage & Wagon
- Model: 50 ^{c}/s Group 7E2
- Build date: 1983
- Total produced: 40
Specifications
- Gauge: 1,067 mm (3 ft 6 in)
- Bogies: Co-Co
- Wheel diameter: 1.22 metres (4 ft 0 in)
- Wheelbase: 13.46 metres (44.2 ft)
  - Bogie: 4.06 metres (13.3 ft)
- Pivot centres: 10.20 metres (33.5 ft)
- Panto shoes: 10.20 metres (33.5 ft)
- Length
  - Over couplers: 18.47 metres (60.6 ft)
  - Over body: 17.50 metres (57.4 ft)
- Width: 2.90 metres (9 ft 6 in)
- Height
  - Pantograph: 4.19 metres (13.7 ft)
  - Body height: 3.94 metres (12.9 ft)
- Axle load: 21 tonnes (21 long tons; 23 short tons)
- Adhesive weight: 124 tonnes (122 long tons; 137 short tons)
- Loco weight: 124 tonnes (122 long tons; 137 short tons)
- Electric system/s: 25 kV AC 50 Hz catenary
- Current pickup: Pantographs
- Traction motors: Six MG-680
  - Rating 1 hour: 515 kW (691 hp)
  - Continuous: 500 kW (670 hp)
- Gear ratio: 20/117
- Loco brake: Air & Rheostatic
- Train brakes: Air & Vacuum
- Couplers: AAR knuckle
Performance figures
- Maximum speed: 88 km/h (55 mph)
- Power output
  - 1 hour: 3,090 kW (4,140 hp)
  - Continuous: 3,000 kW (4,000 hp)
- Tractive effort
  - Starting: 450 kN (100,000 lbf)
  - 1 hour: 319 kN (72,000 lbf)
  - Continuous: 300 kN (67,000 lbf)
Career
- Operators: South African Railways; Spoornet; Transnet Freight Rail; PRASA
- Class: Class 7E2
- Number in class: 40
- Numbers: E7176-E7215
- Delivered: 1983
- First run: 1983

The South African Railways Class 7E2, Series 2 is an electric locomotive. South African Railways placed 40 Class 7E2, Series 2 electric locomotives with a Co-Co wheel arrangement in service in 1983.

== Manufacturer ==
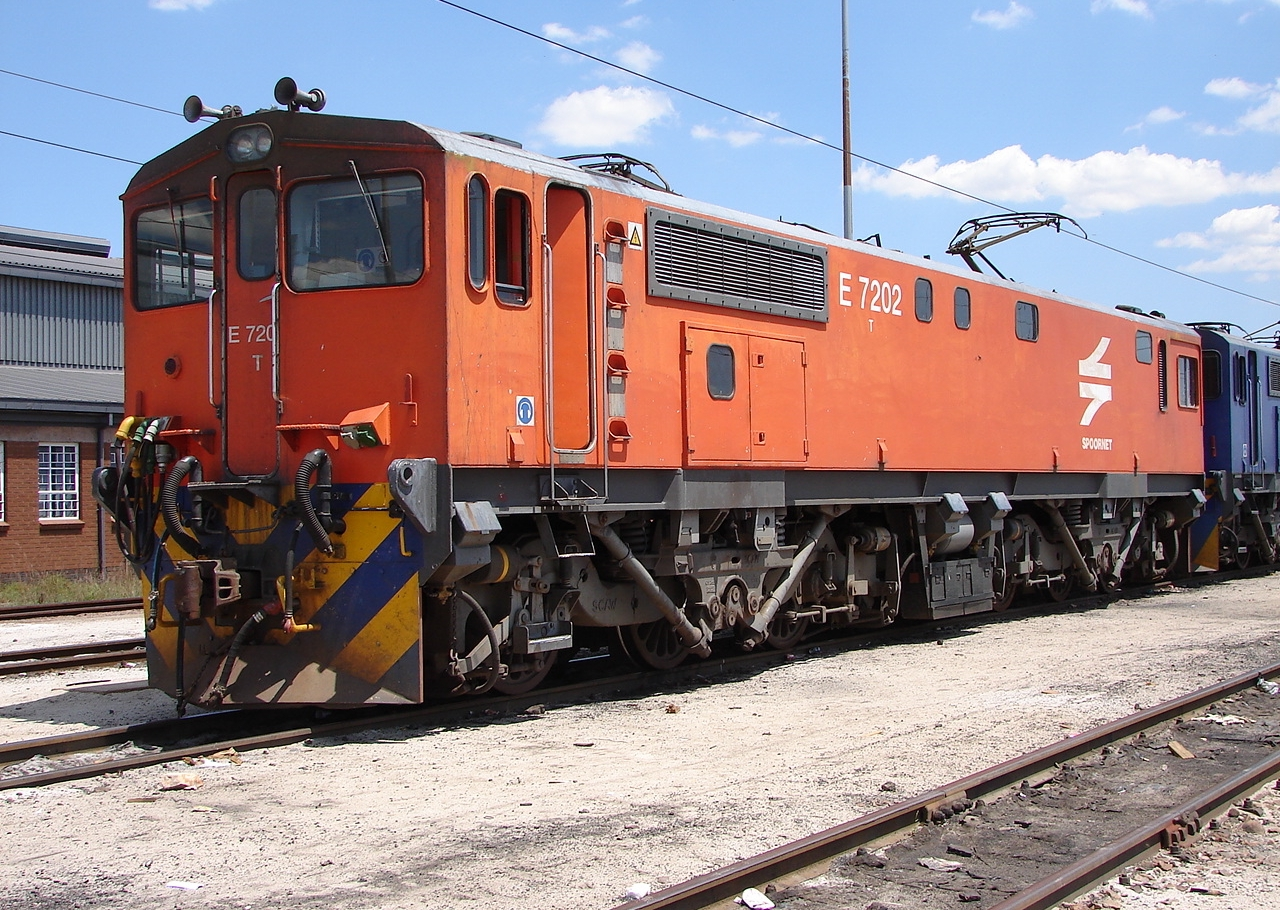
E7202 in Spoornet orange livery at Pyramid South in October 2009

The 25 kV AC Class 7E electric locomotive was designed for the South African Railways (SAR) by the 50 ^{c}/s Group, consisting of ACEC of Belgium, AEG-Telefunken and Siemens of Germany, Alsthom-Atlantique and Société MTE of France, and Brown, Boveri & Cie of Switzerland. The locomotives were built by Union Carriage & Wagon (UCW) in Nigel, Transvaal, which was the sub-contractor for mechanical components and assembly and delivered in 1983, numbered E7176 to E7215. UCW did not allocate builder's numbers to the locomotives it built for the SAR, but used the SAR unit numbers for their record keeping.

== Orientation ==
These dual cab locomotives have a roof access ladder on one side only, just to the right of the cab access door. The roof access ladder end is marked as the no. 2 end.

In visual appearance, the Series 2 locomotives can be distinguished from the Series 1 by the vertical grilles just to the rear of the driver's window on both sides on the Series 2 locomotives, but absent on Series 1. Both series have a large grille to the right of centre on the side opposite the roof access ladder side, near roof level on Series 1 locomotives and low down near sill level on Series 2. The three grilles in line just to the rear of the side doors on Series 1 units were replaced with a single long grille on Series 2 units. Like the Class 7E, some of the Class 7E2, Series 2 locomotives have distinctive "eyebrow" rainwater beadings above their cab windscreens, but these were added post-delivery and were not installed on all the units.

== Characteristics ==
To reduce flange and rail wear, the bogies of both series of the Class 7E2 have a shorter wheelbase than the Class 7E, 4.06 metres (13 feet 3.8 inches) instead of 4.40 metres (14 feet 5.2 inches).

As on the Class 7E, the locomotive's pantograph contact shoe centres are directly above the bogie pivot centres. The reason is to reduce the possibility of pantograph hookups on catenary in sharp curves, such as in turnouts, as a result of sideways movement of the pantograph in relation to the overhead wire.

== Service ==
The Class 7E2, Series 2 was placed in service on the northern 25 kV AC routes which stretch from Pyramid South north of Pretoria via Warmbad to Pietersburg and via Brits and Rustenburg to Thabazimbi. Most of them still serve here.

== Liveries ==
All the Class 7E2, Series 2 locomotives were delivered in the SAR red oxide livery with signal red buffer beams and cowcatchers, yellow whiskers and with the number plates on the sides mounted on three-stripe yellow wings. In the 1990s, some of them were repainted in the Spoornet orange livery with a yellow and blue chevron pattern on the buffer beams and cowcatchers. Some later received the Spoornet maroon livery. In the late 1990s most were repainted in the Spoornet blue livery with outline numbers on the long hood sides. After 2008 in the Transnet Freight Rail (TFR) and Passenger Rail Agency of South Africa (PRASA) era, some were repainted in the TFR red, green and yellow livery and at least one was repainted in the Shosholoza Meyl purple livery.
