= Blue Train (South Africa) =

Luxury train

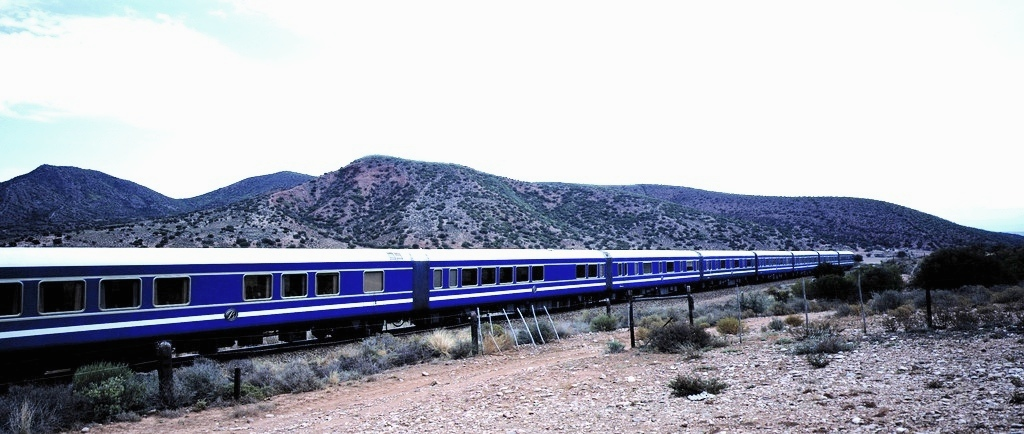
- Blue Train passes through the Karoo

Overview
- Service type: Luxury train
- First service: 1923
- Current operator: Transnet Freight Rail
- Website: bluetrain.co.za

Route
- Termini: Pretoria; Cape Town
- Distance travelled: 1,600 km (990 mi)
- Average journey time: 27 hours

On-board services
- Sleeping arrangements: Yes
- Catering facilities: Yes

Technical
- Track gauge: 1,067 mm (3 ft 6 in)

The Blue Train is a luxury train that travels an approximately 1,600-kilometre (990 mi) journey in South Africa, between Pretoria and Cape Town. It is one of the most luxurious train journeys in the world. It offers butler service, two lounge cars (smoking and non-smoking), an observation car, and carriages with gold-tinted picture windows, in soundproofed, fully carpeted compartments, each with its own en-suite bathroom (many of which are equipped with a full-sized bathtub). The service is promoted as a "magnificent moving five-star hotel" by its operators, who note that kings and presidents have travelled on it.

The train runs through South Africa diagonally, with an average travel duration of 27 hours.

== History ==
The Blue Train's origins date back to 1923, when the Union Express commenced between Johannesburg and Cape Town, it was named the Union Limited in the reverse direction. The Union Express introduced luxury features including a dining saloon in 1933 and air-conditioned carriages from Metro-Cammell in 1939.

After being withdrawn in 1942 in World War II, the service returned in 1946. With the reintroduction of the train, the "blue train" nickname, a reference to the blue-painted steel carriages introduced in 1937, was formally adopted as the new name.

In 1955, it began to be hauled by 3E electric locomotives between Cape Town and Touws River. In 1959 a Wegmann & Co built air-conditioned dining and kitchen car was inserted into each set. In September 1972, two 16-carriage sets built by Union Carriage & Wagon were introduced. In 1997 it was refurbished and relaunched. In 2015, Class 20Es 20-031 and 20-032 were assigned to the train replacing Class 18Es.

Notable past passengers include Nelson Mandela, Quincy Jones, Paul Simon, Mia Farrow, Margaret Thatcher, and Kylie Minogue.

== Route ==
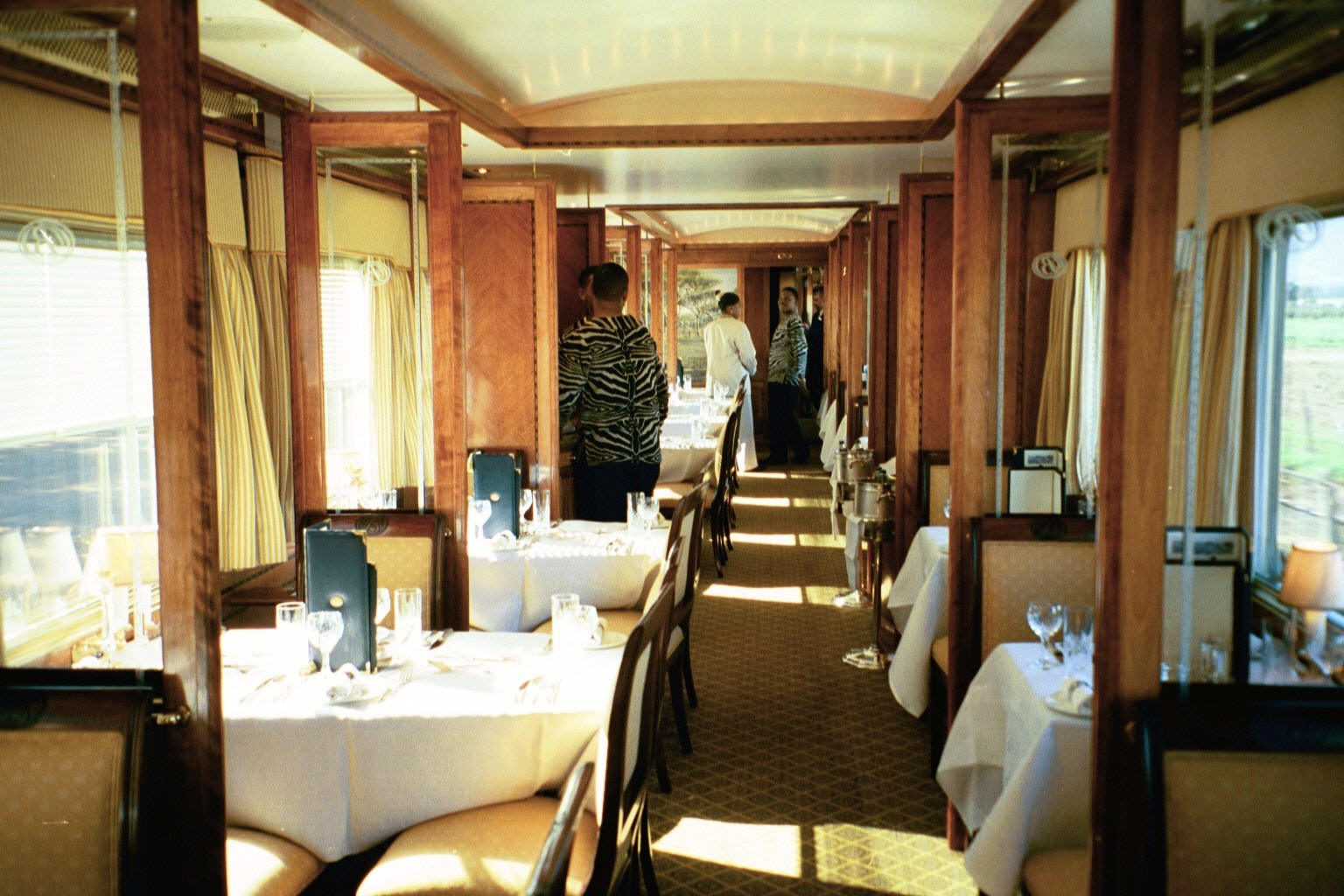

The Blue Train operated on four distinct routes prior to 2002:

- the main Pretoria-Cape Town service
- the scenic "Garden Route" from Cape Town to Port Elizabeth
- to Hoedspruit, along the western edge of Kruger National Park
- to Zimbabwe's Victoria Falls

By 2004, the last two routes had been suspended, the former due to lack of patronage, the latter due to erratic rates being charged for access to the rail network of financially strapped Zimbabwe. As of 2007 the only regular route in operation was Pretoria-Cape Town; however special package tours were offered to Durban or the Bakubung Game Lodge. Other variations on the route have been offered.

Shosholoza Meyl, the long-distance train division of the Passenger Rail Agency of South Africa, operates trains on the same Pretoria to Cape Town route. One train per day runs in each direction, but this not a 'luxury' service. As of 2009, the Blue Train is operated by Luxrail, a division of Transnet Freight Rail.

Two Blue Trains are required to run daily departures from each end of the route, one travelling north, the other south. The first train accommodates 74 passengers in 37 suites, and the second accommodates 58 passengers in 29 suites and has a conference or observation car at the back of the train. The trains travel at a speed of up to 90 kilometres per hour (56 mph).

== See also ==
- Rovos Rail
