= South African Class 19E =

Type of electric locomotive

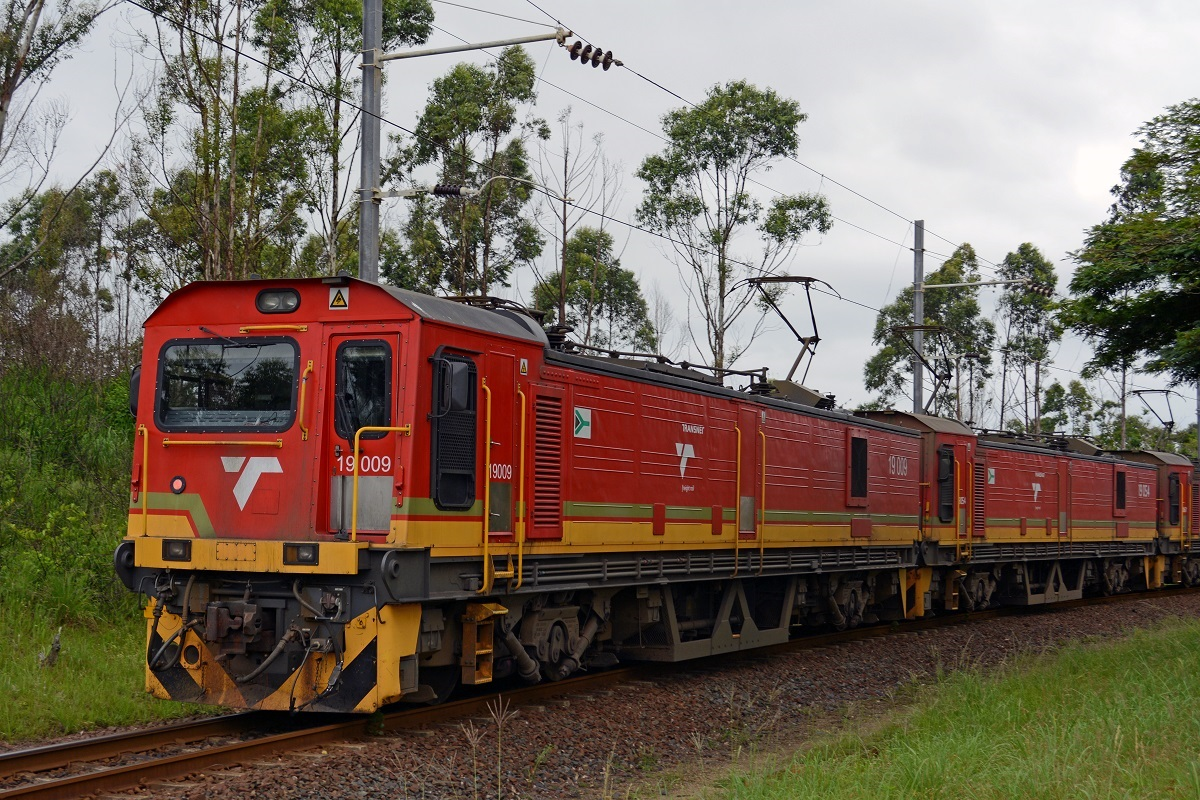
- No. 19-009, 19-054 and 19-067 at the Richards Bay Locomotive Depot, 8 December 2013
Type and origin
- Power type: Electric
- Designer: Mitsui
- Builder: Union Carriage & Wagon
- Model: Mitsui 19E
- Build date: 2007–2011
- Total produced: 110
Specifications
- Configuration
  - AAR: B-B
  - UIC: Bo'Bo'
  - Commonwealth: Bo-Bo
- Gauge: 3 ft 6 in (1,067 mm) Cape gauge
- Wheel diameter: 1,250 mm (49.2 in)
- Length
  - Over couplers: 18,300 mm (60 ft 0.5 in)
- Axle load: 26,000 kg (57,000 lb)
- Adhesive weight: 104,000 kg (229,000 lb)
- Loco weight: 104,000 kg (229,000 lb) max
- Electric system/s: Dual 3 kV DC & 25 kV AC 50 Hz catenary
- Current pickup(s): Pantographs
- Loco brake: Electro-pneumatic, regenerative & rheostatic
- Train brakes: Air
- Couplers: AAR knuckle Type F
Performance figures
- Maximum speed: 120 km/h (75 mph) operating 132 km/h (82 mph) by design
- Power output
  - Continuous: 3,000 kW (4,000 hp)
- Tractive effort
  - Starting: 392 kN (88,000 lbf)
  - Continuous: 300 kN (67,000 lbf)
Career
- Operators: Transnet Freight Rail
- Class: 19E
- Number in class: 110
- Numbers: 19-001 to 19-110
- Delivered: 2009
- First run: 2009

The Transnet Freight Rail Class 19E of 2009 is a South African electric locomotive.

In 2009, Transnet Freight Rail placed the first of 110 Class 19E single-cab dual-voltage 3 kV DC and 25 kV AC electric locomotives with a Bo-Bo wheel arrangement in service on the Coalink line from Ermelo to Richards Bay.

== Manufacturer ==
The dual-voltage 3 kV DC and 25 kV AC Class 19E is the product of a joint venture by Mitsui for the design, Toshiba for the electrical equipment, Union Carriage and Wagon (UCW) for the bodies and the RSD division of DCD-Dorbyl for the bogies. It was locally manufactured by UCW in Nigel, Gauteng. Road testing on the Class 19E started in August 2008.

== Characteristics ==
The Class 19E was the first South African AC locomotive to incorporate regenerative as well as rheostatic electric braking. While regenerative braking was used on all South African 3 kV DC mainline locomotives dating back all the way to the introduction of the Class 1E in 1925, the notable exception being the Class 18E, all earlier 25 kV and 50 kV AC South African locomotives made use of rheostatic braking only.

The locomotive uses Toshiba-made 3-phase AC motors, powered through Insulated-gate bipolar transistor (IGBT) control. It is a dual-voltage locomotive, designed to operate on either 3 kV DC or 25 kV AC. Like the earlier Classes 7E1, 7E4, 9E, 11E, 15E and 18E electric locomotives, these engines have driving cabs at one end only since they would only be utilised in multi-unit consists.

As on the dual-voltage Classes 20E and 21E, the main electric circuit is automatically selected in either AC or DC mode based on the voltage of the overhead contact wire feeding the locomotive. To facilitate automatic trouble-free transition on the run, the locomotive is equipped with onboard voltage detectors, while the overhead wire is equipped with two wooden isolators and a 3 metres (10 feet) length of neutral wire to separate the AC and DC feeds. The neutral section is connected to the rails, which serve as the return conductor on electrified lines.

The transition process requires that the locomotive should be switched off automatically before it reaches the isolators and the unpowered overhead wire section, and automatically restarted after exiting from under the unpowered wire. This is done by a pair of track magnets, one on either side of the neutral overhead wire and spaced 45 metres (148 feet) apart. The two magnets are mounted with their polarities reversed in relation to each other and they activate a magnetic relay, located underneath the locomotive, to do the switching off and restarting.

By July 2009, Transnet Freight Rail (TFR) had taken delivery of the first three Class 19E locomotives, and UCW intended to deliver between six and eight new units per quarter.

== Service ==
The Class 19E locomotives were placed in service on the 580 kilometres (360 miles) long Coalink line from Ermelo to Richards Bay to haul export coal from forty-four coal mines in Mpumalanga to the Richards Bay Coal Terminal (RBCT), the export coal harbour in Richards Bay, KwaZulu-Natal. In the process, it relieved some Classes 7E, 7E1 and 7E3 electric locomotives on the Coalink Line for use elsewhere.

== Illustration ==
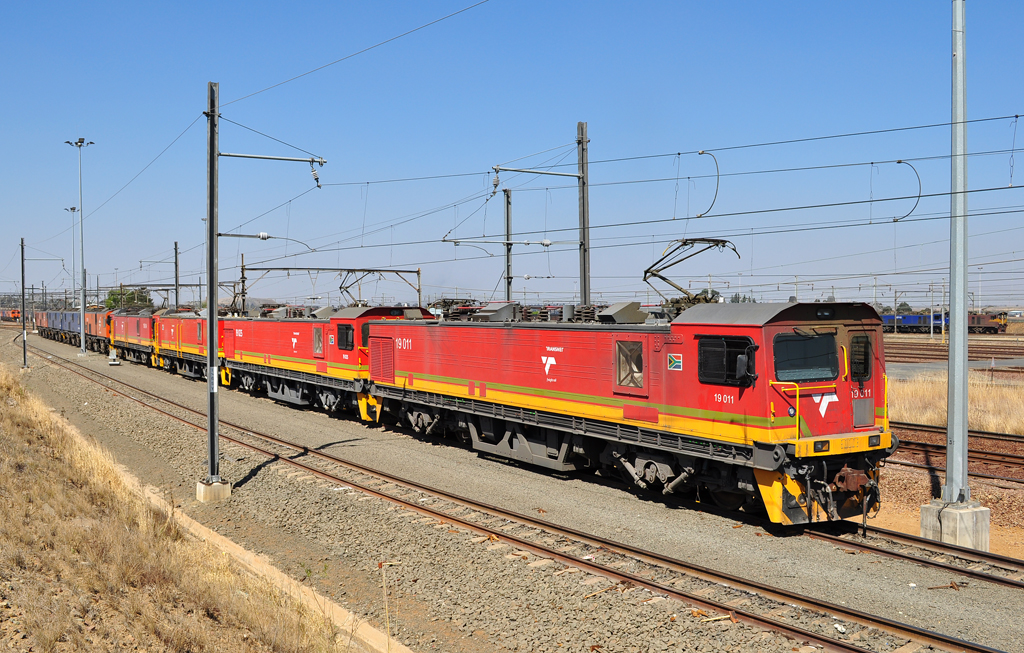
No. 19-011 at Ermelo, Mpumalanga, 18 September 2010
