= List of South African locomotive classes =

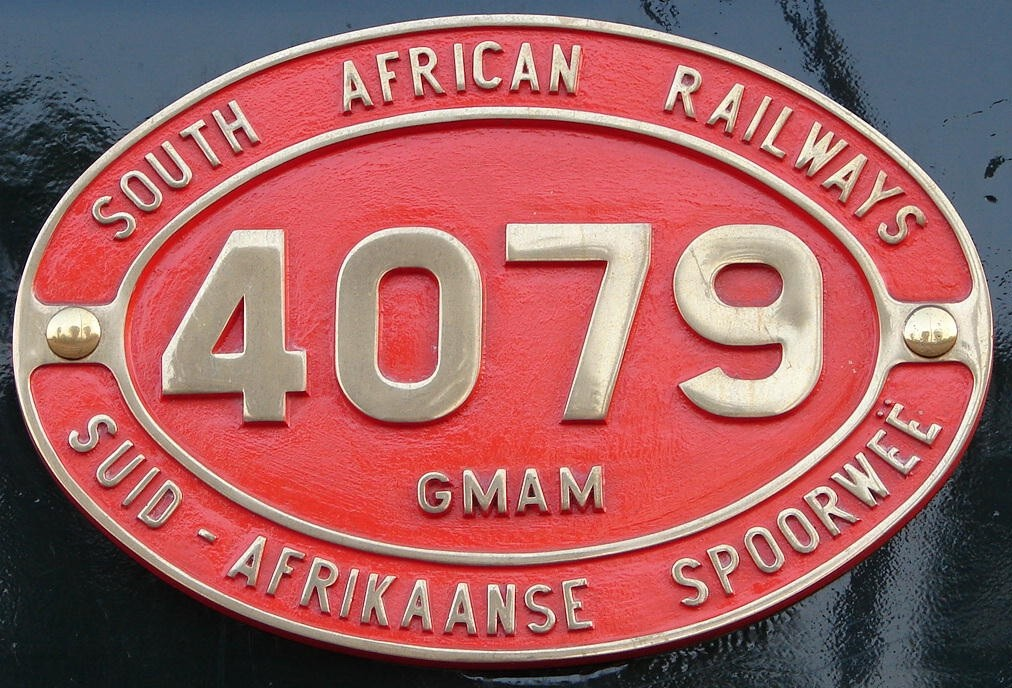

This list shows past and current rail transport locomotive classes used in South Africa. It includes locomotives from all original operators:

- Cape Government Railways (CGR)
- Cape Town Railway and Dock (CTR&D)
- Central South African Railways (CSAR)
- Deutsch-Südwest-Afrika (DSWA)
- Imperial Military Railways (IMR)
- Kowie Railway
- Metropolitan & Suburban Railway (M&S)
- Namaqualand Railway (CCC & NCC)
- Natal Government Railways (NGR)
- Natal Railway Company (NRC)
- Nederlandsche-Zuid-Afrikaansche Spoorweg-Maatschappij (NZASM)
- New Cape Central Railway (NCCR)
- Oranje-Vrijstaat Gouwerment-Spoorwegen (OVGS)
- Passenger Rail Agency of South Africa (PRASA)
- Pretoria-Pietersburg Railway (PPR)
- South African Railways (SAR)
- Spoornet
- Transnet Freight Rail (TFR)
- Zululand Railway Company

== Steam locomotives ==
| Class or Configuration | Whyte notation | Gauge | First Run |
|---|---|---|---|
| CTR&D 0-4-2 Blackie | 0-4-2T ex 0-4-0T | 4 ft 8 1/2 in (1,435 mm) Standard | 1859 |
| CTR&D 0-4-2 | 0-4-2 | 4 ft 8 1/2 in (1,435 mm) Standard | 1860 |
| CTR&D 2-4-0 | 2-4-0T | 4 ft 8 1/2 in (1,435 mm) Standard | 1864 |
| CGR 0-4-0 1873 | 0-4-0ST | 3 ft 6 in (1,070 mm) Cape | 1873 |
| CGR 0-4-0 1874 | 0-4-0ST | 3 ft 6 in (1,070 mm) Cape | 1874 |
| CGR 0-4-0 Aid | 0-4-0ST | 4 ft 8 1/2 in (1,435 mm) Standard | 1878 |
| CGR 0-4-0ST 1881 | 0-4-0ST | 3 ft 6 in (1,070 mm) Cape | 1881 |
| CGR 0-4-0 Coffee Pot | 0-4-0ST | 3 ft 6 in (1,070 mm) Cape | 1881 |
| CGR 0-6-0 1902 | 0-6-0ST | 3 ft 6 in (1,070 mm) Cape | 1902 |
| CGR 0-6-0 1876 | 0-6-0T | 3 ft 6 in (1,070 mm) Cape | 1876 |
| CGR 2-6-0 1900 | 2-6-0ST | 3 ft 6 in (1,070 mm) Cape | 1900 |
| CGR 2-6-0 1902 | 2-6-0ST | 3 ft 6 in (1,070 mm) Cape | 1902 |
| CGR 1st 0-4-0 1875 | 0-4-0ST | 3 ft 6 in (1,070 mm) Cape | 1875 |
| CGR 1st 0-4-0 1876 | 0-4-0ST | 3 ft 6 in (1,070 mm) Cape | 1876 |
| CGR 1st 2-6-0 1876 BP | 2-6-0 | 3 ft 6 in (1,070 mm) Cape | 1876 |
| CGR 1st 2-6-0 1876 K | 2-6-0 | 3 ft 6 in (1,070 mm) Cape | 1876 |
| CGR 1st 2-6-0 1879 | 2-6-0 | 3 ft 6 in (1,070 mm) Cape | 1879 |
| CGR 1st 2-6-0 1891 | 2-6-0 | 3 ft 6 in (1,070 mm) Cape | 1891 |
| CGR 1st 2-6-0 1876 | 2-6-0ST | 3 ft 6 in (1,070 mm) Cape | 1876 |
| CGR 1st 4-4-0 1879 | 4-4-0 | 3 ft 6 in (1,070 mm) Cape | 1879 |
| CGR 1st 4-4-0 1875 | 4-4-0T | 3 ft 6 in (1,070 mm) Cape | 1875 |
| CGR 1st 4-4-0 1881 | 4-4-0TT | 3 ft 6 in (1,070 mm) Cape | 1881 |
| CGR 2nd 2-6-2 1875 | 2-6-2TT | 3 ft 6 in (1,070 mm) Cape | 1875 |
| CGR 2nd 4-4-0 1882 | 4-4-0T | 3 ft 6 in (1,070 mm) Cape | 1882 |
| CGR 3rd 2-6-0 1900 | 2-6-0T | 3 ft 6 in (1,070 mm) Cape | 1900 |
| CGR 3rd 4-4-0 1883 | 4-4-0 | 3 ft 6 in (1,070 mm) Cape | 1883 |
| CGR 3rd 4-4-0 1884 | 4-4-0 | 3 ft 6 in (1,070 mm) Cape | 1884 |
| CGR 3rd 4-4-0 1889 | 4-4-0 | 3 ft 6 in (1,070 mm) Cape | 1889 |
| CGR 3rd 4-4-0 1898 | 4-4-0 | 3 ft 6 in (1,070 mm) Cape | 1898 |
| CGR 3rd 4-4-0 1901 | 4-4-0 | 3 ft 6 in (1,070 mm) Cape | 1901 |
| CGR 3rd 4-4-0 1903 | 4-4-0 | 3 ft 6 in (1,070 mm) Cape | 1903 |
| CGR 4th 4-4-2 1897 | 4-4-2 | 3 ft 6 in (1,070 mm) Cape | 1897 |
| CGR 4th 4-6-0 1880 | 4-6-0TT | 3 ft 6 in (1,070 mm) Cape | 1880 |
| CGR 4th 4-6-0 1882 | 4-6-0TT | 3 ft 6 in (1,070 mm) Cape | 1882 |
| CGR 4th 4-6-0 1882 Joy | 4-6-0TT | 3 ft 6 in (1,070 mm) Cape | 1882 |
| CGR 4th 4-6-0 1884 | 4-6-0TT | 3 ft 6 in (1,070 mm) Cape | 1884 |
| CGR 5th 4-6-0 1890 | 4-6-0 | 3 ft 6 in (1,070 mm) Cape | 1890 |
| CGR 5th 4-6-0 1891 | 4-6-0 | 3 ft 6 in (1,070 mm) Cape | 1891 |
| CGR Fairlie | 0-6-0+0-6-0 | 3 ft 6 in (1,070 mm) Cape | 1876 |
| CGR Kitson-Meyer | 0-6-0+0-6-0 | 3 ft 6 in (1,070 mm) Cape | 1903 |
| CGR Railmotor | 0-4-0+4 | 3 ft 6 in (1,070 mm) Cape | 1906 |
| CGR NG 0-4-0 | 0-4-0T | 2 ft 0 in (610 mm) Narrow | 1903 |
| CGR NG 0-6-0 | 0-6-0T | 2 ft 0 in (610 mm) Narrow | 1903 |
| CGR NG 4-6-2 | 4-6-2T | 2 ft 0 in (610 mm) Narrow | 1908 |
| CGR NG Type A 2-6-4 | 2-6-4T | 2 ft 0 in (610 mm) Narrow | 1902 |
| CGR NG Type C 0-4-0 | 0-4-0T | 2 ft 0 in (610 mm) Narrow | 1902 |
| CSAR Class C 2-8-4 | 2-8-4T | 3 ft 6 in (1,070 mm) Cape | 1900 |
| CSAR Class E 4-10-2 | 4-10-2T | 3 ft 6 in (1,070 mm) Cape | 1901 |
| CSAR Rack 4-6-4 | 4-6-4RT | 3 ft 6 in (1,070 mm) Cape | 1905 |
| CSAR Railmotor | 0-4-0+4 | 3 ft 6 in (1,070 mm) Cape | 1907 |
| Durban Harbour Congella | 0-4-0ST | 3 ft 6 in (1,070 mm) Cape | 1902 |
| Durban Harbour Edward Innes | 0-6-0T | 3 ft 6 in (1,070 mm) Cape | 1901 |
| Durban Harbour John Milne | 0-6-0ST | 3 ft 6 in (1,070 mm) Cape | 1879 |
| Durban Harbour Sir Albert | 0-6-0ST | 3 ft 6 in (1,070 mm) Cape | 1904 |
| East London Harbour 0-4-0VB | 0-4-0VB | 7 ft 1/4 in (2,140 mm) Brunel | 1873 |
| Kowie 0-6-0 | 0-6-0T | 3 ft 6 in (1,070 mm) Cape | 1882 |
| Kowie 4-4-0 | 4-4-0T | 3 ft 6 in (1,070 mm) Cape | 1882 |
| M&S 4-6-2 | 4-6-2T | 3 ft 6 in (1,070 mm) Cape | 1896 |
| Namaqualand Condenser | 0-4-0WT | 2 ft 6 in (760 mm) Namaqualand | 1886 |
| Namaqualand Caledonia | 0-4-2IST | 2 ft 6 in (760 mm) Namaqualand | 1904 |
| Namaqualand Pioneer | 0-4-2ST | 2 ft 6 in (760 mm) Namaqualand | 1901 |
| Namaqualand Britannia | 0-4-2T | 2 ft 6 in (760 mm) Namaqualand | 1905 |
| Namaqualand 0-6-0 | 0-6-0T | 2 ft 6 in (760 mm) Namaqualand | 1871 |
| Namaqualand Clara | 0-6-2 | 2 ft 6 in (760 mm) Namaqualand | 1890 |
| Namaqualand Scotia | 0-6-2 | 2 ft 6 in (760 mm) Namaqualand | 1900 |
| NRC Durban | 0-4-0ST | 4 ft 8 1/2 in (1,435 mm) Standard | 1865 |
| NRC Natal | 0-4-0WT | 4 ft 8 1/2 in (1,435 mm) Standard | 1860 |
| NRC Perseverance | 4-4-0T | 4 ft 8 1/2 in (1,435 mm) Standard | 1876 |
| NGR Durban & Pietermaritzburg | 2-6-0T | 3 ft 6 in (1,070 mm) Cape | 1877 |
| NGR Havelock | 4-6-2TT ex 2-8-2TT | 3 ft 6 in (1,070 mm) Cape | 1888 |
| NGR I 2-6-0 | 2-6-0 | 3 ft 6 in (1,070 mm) Cape | 1902 |
| NGR I 2-6-2T | 2-6-2T | 3 ft 6 in (1,070 mm) Cape | 1901 |
| NGR K 0-4-0 | 0-4-0ST | 3 ft 6 in (1,070 mm) Cape | 1891 |
| NGR K 0-6-0 | 0-6-0ST | 3 ft 6 in (1,070 mm) Cape | 1880 |
| NGR K 2-6-0 | 2-6-0T | 3 ft 6 in (1,070 mm) Cape | 1877 |
| NGR NG N 4-6-2 | 4-6-2T | 2 ft 0 in (610 mm) Narrow | 1906 |
| NZASM 10 Tonner | 0-4-0T | 3 ft 6 in (1,070 mm) Cape | 1889 |
| NZASM 13 Tonner | 0-4-0T | 3 ft 6 in (1,070 mm) Cape | 1889 |
| NZASM 14 Tonner | 0-4-0T | 3 ft 6 in (1,070 mm) Cape | 1889 |
| NZASM 18 Tonner | 0-6-0ST | 3 ft 6 in (1,070 mm) Cape | 1890 |
| NZASM 19 Tonner | 0-4-2T | 3 ft 6 in (1,070 mm) Cape | 1891 |
| NZASM 32 Tonner | 0-4-2RT | 3 ft 6 in (1,070 mm) Cape | 1894 |
| NZASM 40 Tonner | 0-6-2T | 3 ft 6 in (1,070 mm) Cape | 1892 |
| Port Elizabeth Harbour 0-4-0ST | 0-4-0ST | 3 ft 6 in (1,070 mm) Cape | 1894 |
| PPR 26 Tonner | 0-6-0ST | 3 ft 6 in (1,070 mm) Cape | 1896 |
| PPR 35 Tonner Portuguese | 4-6-0T | 3 ft 6 in (1,070 mm) Cape | 1887 |
| DSWA 0-6-0 | 0-6-0T | 3 ft 6 in (1,070 mm) Cape | 1911 |
| DSWA 0-10-0 | 0-10-0 | 3 ft 6 in (1,070 mm) Cape | 1911 |
| DSWA 2-8-0 Tender | 2-8-0 | 3 ft 6 in (1,070 mm) Cape | 1911 |
| DSWA 2-8-0 Tank | 2-8-0T | 3 ft 6 in (1,070 mm) Cape | 1907 |
| DSWA NG Class Ha | 0-6-2T | 1 ft 11 5/8 in (600 mm) Otavi | 1904 |
| DSWA NG Class Hb | 0-6-2T | 1 ft 11 5/8 in (600 mm) Otavi | 1905 |
| DSWA NG Class Hc | 0-6-0T | 1 ft 11 5/8 in (600 mm) Otavi | 1907 |
| DSWA NG Class Hd | 2-8-2 | 1 ft 11 5/8 in (600 mm) Otavi | 1912 |
| DSWA NG Jung | 0-6-2T | 1 ft 11 5/8 in (600 mm) Otavi | 1904 |
| DSWA NG Zwillinge | 0-6-0T | 1 ft 11 5/8 in (600 mm) Otavi | 1898 |
| Table Bay Harbour 0-4-0ST | 0-4-0ST | 7 ft 1/4 in (2,140 mm) Brunel | 1881 |
| Table Bay Harbour 0-4-0T | 0-4-0T | 7 ft 1/4 in (2,140 mm) Brunel | 1874 |
| Table Bay Harbour 0-4-0WT | 0-4-0WT | 7 ft 1/4 in (2,140 mm) Brunel | 1879 |
| Walvis Bay 2-4-2 | 2-4-2T | 2 ft 6 in (760 mm) Namaqualand | 1899 |
| SAR Clayton Railmotor | 0-4-0+4 | 3 ft 6 in (1,070 mm) Cape | 1929 |
| SAR Harbour 0-4-0ST | 0-4-0ST | 3 ft 6 in (1,070 mm) Cape | 1903 |
| SAR Harbour 0-4-0T | 0-4-0T | 3 ft 6 in (1,070 mm) Cape | 1909 |
| SAR Class A | 4-8-2T | 3 ft 6 in (1,070 mm) Cape | 1888 |
| SAR Class B | 0-6-4T | 3 ft 6 in (1,070 mm) Cape | 1893 |
| SAR Class C | 4-6-0T | 3 ft 6 in (1,070 mm) Cape | 1879 |
| SAR Class C1 | 4-6-2T | 3 ft 6 in (1,070 mm) Cape | 1901 |
| SAR Class C2 | 4-6-4T | 3 ft 6 in (1,070 mm) Cape | 1896 |
| SAR Class D | 2-6-4T | 3 ft 6 in (1,070 mm) Cape | 1898 |
| SAR Class E | 4-6-4T | 3 ft 6 in (1,070 mm) Cape | 1902 |
| SAR Class F | 4-6-4T | 3 ft 6 in (1,070 mm) Cape | 1904 |
| SAR Class G | 4-8-2T | 3 ft 6 in (1,070 mm) Cape | 1904 |
| SAR Class H | 4-10-2T | 3 ft 6 in (1,070 mm) Cape | 1899 |
| SAR Class H1 | 4-8-2T | 3 ft 6 in (1,070 mm) Cape | 1903 |
| SAR Class H2 | 4-8-2T | 3 ft 6 in (1,070 mm) Cape | 1909 |
| SAR Class J | 4-6-4T | 3 ft 6 in (1,070 mm) Cape | 1915 |
| SAR Class K | 4-6-4T | 3 ft 6 in (1,070 mm) Cape | 1917 |
| SAR Class 1 | 4-8-0 | 3 ft 6 in (1,070 mm) Cape | 1904 |
| SAR Class 1A | 4-8-0 | 3 ft 6 in (1,070 mm) Cape | 1910 |
| SAR Class 1B & 1 | 4-8-2 ex 4-8-0 | 3 ft 6 in (1,070 mm) Cape | 1906 |
| SAR Class 2 | 4-6-2 | 3 ft 6 in (1,070 mm) Cape | 1905 |
| SAR Class 2C | 4-6-2 | 3 ft 6 in (1,070 mm) Cape | 1910 |
| SAR Class 3 & 3R | 4-8-2 | 3 ft 6 in (1,070 mm) Cape | 1909 |
| SAR Class 3A | 4-8-2 | 3 ft 6 in (1,070 mm) Cape | 1910 |
| SAR Class 3B & 3BR | 4-8-2 | 3 ft 6 in (1,070 mm) Cape | 1912 |
| SAR Class 4 | 4-8-2 | 3 ft 6 in (1,070 mm) Cape | 1911 |
| SAR Class 4A & 4AR | 4-8-2 | 3 ft 6 in (1,070 mm) Cape | 1913 |
| SAR Class 5 & 5R | 4-6-2 | 3 ft 6 in (1,070 mm) Cape | 1912 |
| SAR Class 5A | 4-6-2 | 3 ft 6 in (1,070 mm) Cape | 1903 |
| SAR Class 5B & 5BR | 4-6-2 | 3 ft 6 in (1,070 mm) Cape | 1904 |
| SAR Class 6 | 4-6-0 | 3 ft 6 in (1,070 mm) Cape | 1893 |
| SAR Class 6A | 4-6-0 | 3 ft 6 in (1,070 mm) Cape | 1896 |
| SAR Class 6B | 4-6-0 | 3 ft 6 in (1,070 mm) Cape | 1897 |
| SAR Class 6C | 4-6-0 | 3 ft 6 in (1,070 mm) Cape | 1896 |
| SAR Class 6D | 4-6-0 | 3 ft 6 in (1,070 mm) Cape | 1898 |
| SAR Class 6E | 4-6-0 | 3 ft 6 in (1,070 mm) Cape | 1898 |
| SAR Class 6F | 4-6-0 | 3 ft 6 in (1,070 mm) Cape | 1900 |
| SAR Class 6G | 4-6-0 | 3 ft 6 in (1,070 mm) Cape | 1901 |
| SAR Class 6H | 4-6-0 | 3 ft 6 in (1,070 mm) Cape | 1901 |
| SAR Class 6J | 4-6-0 | 3 ft 6 in (1,070 mm) Cape | 1902 |
| SAR Class 6K | 4-6-0 | 3 ft 6 in (1,070 mm) Cape | 1901 |
| SAR Class 6L | 4-6-0 | 3 ft 6 in (1,070 mm) Cape | 1904 |
| SAR Class 6Y | 2-6-2 | 3 ft 6 in (1,070 mm) Cape | 1903 |
| SAR Class 6Z | 2-6-4 | 3 ft 6 in (1,070 mm) Cape | 1901 |
| SAR Class 7 | 4-8-0 | 3 ft 6 in (1,070 mm) Cape | 1892 |
| SAR Class 7A & 7AS | 4-8-0 | 3 ft 6 in (1,070 mm) Cape | 1896 |
| SAR Class 7B | 4-8-0 | 3 ft 6 in (1,070 mm) Cape | 1900 |
| SAR Class 7C & 7CS | 4-8-0 | 3 ft 6 in (1,070 mm) Cape | 1902 |
| SAR Class 7D | 4-8-0 | 3 ft 6 in (1,070 mm) Cape | 1899 |
| SAR Class 7E | 4-8-0 | 3 ft 6 in (1,070 mm) Cape | 1899 |
| SAR Class 7F | 4-8-0 | 3 ft 6 in (1,070 mm) Cape | 1913 |
| SAR Class 8 & 8W | 4-8-0 | 3 ft 6 in (1,070 mm) Cape | 1902 |
| SAR Class 8A & 8AW | 4-8-0 | 3 ft 6 in (1,070 mm) Cape | 1902 |
| SAR Class 8B & 8BW | 4-8-0 | 3 ft 6 in (1,070 mm) Cape | 1903 |
| SAR Class 8C & 8CW | 4-8-0 | 3 ft 6 in (1,070 mm) Cape | 1903 |
| SAR Class 8D & 8DW | 4-8-0 | 3 ft 6 in (1,070 mm) Cape | 1903 |
| SAR Class 8E | 4-8-0 | 3 ft 6 in (1,070 mm) Cape | 1903 |
| SAR Class 8F & 8FW | 4-8-0 | 3 ft 6 in (1,070 mm) Cape | 1904 |
| SAR Class 8R | 4-8-0 | 3 ft 6 in (1,070 mm) Cape | 1930 |
| SAR Class 8X | 2-8-0 | 3 ft 6 in (1,070 mm) Cape | 1901 |
| SAR Class 8Y | 2-8-0 | 3 ft 6 in (1,070 mm) Cape | 1903 |
| SAR Class 8Z | 2-8-0 | 3 ft 6 in (1,070 mm) Cape | 1904 |
| SAR Class 9 | 4-6-2 | 3 ft 6 in (1,070 mm) Cape | 1904 |
| SAR Class 10 | 4-6-2 | 3 ft 6 in (1,070 mm) Cape | 1904 |
| SAR Class 10A & 10BR | 4-6-2 | 3 ft 6 in (1,070 mm) Cape | 1910 |
| SAR Class 10B & 10BR | 4-6-2 | 3 ft 6 in (1,070 mm) Cape | 1910 |
| SAR Class 10C & 10CR | 4-6-2 | 3 ft 6 in (1,070 mm) Cape | 1910 |
| SAR Class 10D | 4-6-2 | 3 ft 6 in (1,070 mm) Cape | 1910 |
| SAR Class 11 | 2-8-2 | 3 ft 6 in (1,070 mm) Cape | 1904 |
| SAR Class 12 & 12R | 4-8-2 | 3 ft 6 in (1,070 mm) Cape | 1912 |
| SAR Class 12A & 12AR | 4-8-2 | 3 ft 6 in (1,070 mm) Cape | 1919 |
| SAR Class 12B & 12R | 4-8-2 | 3 ft 6 in (1,070 mm) Cape | 1920 |
| SAR Class 13 | 4-8-0TT | 3 ft 6 in (1,070 mm) Cape | 1904 |
| SAR Class 14 & 14R | 4-8-2 | 3 ft 6 in (1,070 mm) Cape | 1913 |
| SAR Class 14A & 14R | 4-8-2 | 3 ft 6 in (1,070 mm) Cape | 1914 |
| SAR Class 14B, 14 & 14R | 4-8-2 | 3 ft 6 in (1,070 mm) Cape | 1915 |
| SAR Class 14C, CB, 14CR, CRB 1st | 4-8-2 | 3 ft 6 in (1,070 mm) Cape | 1918 |
| SAR Class 14C, CB, 14CR, CRB 2nd | 4-8-2 | 3 ft 6 in (1,070 mm) Cape | 1919 |
| SAR Class 14C, CB, 14CR, CRB 3rd | 4-8-2 | 3 ft 6 in (1,070 mm) Cape | 1919 |
| SAR Class 14C, CM, 14CR, CRM 4th | 4-8-2 | 3 ft 6 in (1,070 mm) Cape | 1922 |
| SAR Class 15 & 15AR | 4-8-2 | 3 ft 6 in (1,070 mm) Cape | 1914 |
| SAR Class 15A & 15AR | 4-8-2 | 3 ft 6 in (1,070 mm) Cape | 1914 |
| SAR Class 15B & 15BR | 4-8-2 | 3 ft 6 in (1,070 mm) Cape | 1918 |
| SAR Class 15C & 15CB | 4-8-2 | 3 ft 6 in (1,070 mm) Cape | 1925 |
| SAR Class 15CA | 4-8-2 | 3 ft 6 in (1,070 mm) Cape | 1926 |
| SAR Class 15E | 4-8-2 | 3 ft 6 in (1,070 mm) Cape | 1935 |
| SAR Class 15F | 4-8-2 | 3 ft 6 in (1,070 mm) Cape | 1938 |
| SAR Class 16 & 16R | 4-6-2 | 3 ft 6 in (1,070 mm) Cape | 1914 |
| SAR Class 16A | 4-6-2 | 3 ft 6 in (1,070 mm) Cape | 1915 |
| SAR Class 16B & 16CR | 4-6-2 | 3 ft 6 in (1,070 mm) Cape | 1917 |
| SAR Class 16C & 16CR | 4-6-2 | 3 ft 6 in (1,070 mm) Cape | 1919 |
| SAR Class 16D | 4-6-2 | 3 ft 6 in (1,070 mm) Cape | 1925 |
| SAR Class 16DA 1928 | 4-6-2 | 3 ft 6 in (1,070 mm) Cape | 1928 |
| SAR Class 16DA 1930 | 4-6-2 | 3 ft 6 in (1,070 mm) Cape | 1930 |
| SAR Class 16E | 4-6-2 | 3 ft 6 in (1,070 mm) Cape | 1935 |
| SAR Class 17 | 4-8-0TT | 3 ft 6 in (1,070 mm) Cape | 1926 |
| SAR Class 18 | 2-10-2 | 3 ft 6 in (1,070 mm) Cape | 1927 |
| SAR Class 19 & 19R | 4-8-2 | 3 ft 6 in (1,070 mm) Cape | 1928 |
| SAR Class 19A & 19AR | 4-8-2 | 3 ft 6 in (1,070 mm) Cape | 1929 |
| SAR Class 19B & 19BR | 4-8-2 | 3 ft 6 in (1,070 mm) Cape | 1930 |
| SAR Class 19C | 4-8-2 | 3 ft 6 in (1,070 mm) Cape | 1935 |
| SAR Class 19D | 4-8-2 | 3 ft 6 in (1,070 mm) Cape | 1937 |
| SAR Class 20 | 2-10-2 | 3 ft 6 in (1,070 mm) Cape | 1935 |
| SAR Class 21 | 2-10-4 | 3 ft 6 in (1,070 mm) Cape | 1937 |
| SAR Class 23 | 4-8-2 | 3 ft 6 in (1,070 mm) Cape | 1938 |
| SAR Class 24 | 2-8-4 | 3 ft 6 in (1,070 mm) Cape | 1949 |
| SAR Class 25 & 25NC | 4-8-4 | 3 ft 6 in (1,070 mm) Cape | 1953 |
| SAR Class 25NC | 4-8-4 | 3 ft 6 in (1,070 mm) Cape | 1953 |
| SAR Class 26 | 4-8-4 | 3 ft 6 in (1,070 mm) Cape | 1981 |
| SAR Class Exp 1 | 4-6-2 | 3 ft 6 in (1,070 mm) Cape | 1907 |
| SAR Class Exp 2 | 2-8-0 | 3 ft 6 in (1,070 mm) Cape | 1902 |
| SAR Class Exp 3 | 2-8-0 | 3 ft 6 in (1,070 mm) Cape | 1903 |
| SAR Class Exp 4 | 2-8-2 | 3 ft 6 in (1,070 mm) Cape | 1903 |
| SAR Class Exp 5 | 2-8-2 | 3 ft 6 in (1,070 mm) Cape | 1906 |
| SAR Class Exp 6 | 4-8-0 | 3 ft 6 in (1,070 mm) Cape | 1906 |
| SAR Katanga Mikado | 2-8-2 | 3 ft 6 in (1,070 mm) Cape | 1917 |
| SAR Class S | 0-8-0 | 3 ft 6 in (1,070 mm) Cape | 1929 |
| SAR Class S1 | 0-8-0 | 3 ft 6 in (1,070 mm) Cape | 1947 |
| SAR Class S2 | 0-8-0 | 3 ft 6 in (1,070 mm) Cape | 1952 |
| SAR Class MA | 2-6-6-0 | 3 ft 6 in (1,070 mm) Cape | 1909 |
| SAR Class MB | 2-6-6-0 | 3 ft 6 in (1,070 mm) Cape | 1910 |
| SAR Class MC | 2-6-6-0 | 3 ft 6 in (1,070 mm) Cape | 1912 |
| SAR Class MC1 | 2-6-6-0 | 3 ft 6 in (1,070 mm) Cape | 1914 |
| SAR Class MD | 2-6-6-2 | 3 ft 6 in (1,070 mm) Cape | 1910 |
| SAR Class ME | 2-6-6-2 | 3 ft 6 in (1,070 mm) Cape | 1912 |
| SAR Class MF | 2-6-6-2 | 3 ft 6 in (1,070 mm) Cape | 1911 |
| SAR Class MG | 2-6-6-2 | 3 ft 6 in (1,070 mm) Cape | 1911 |
| SAR Class MH | 2-6-6-2 | 3 ft 6 in (1,070 mm) Cape | 1915 |
| SAR Class MJ | 2-6-6-0 | 3 ft 6 in (1,070 mm) Cape | 1914 |
| SAR Class MJ1 | 2-6-6-0 | 3 ft 6 in (1,070 mm) Cape | 1918 |
| SAR Class FC | 2-6-2+2-6-2 | 3 ft 6 in (1,070 mm) Cape | 1925 |
| SAR Class FD | 2-6-2+2-6-2 | 3 ft 6 in (1,070 mm) Cape | 1926 |
| SAR Class HF | 2-8-2+2-8-2 | 3 ft 6 in (1,070 mm) Cape | 1927 |
| SAR Class KM | 0-6-0+0-6-0 | 3 ft 6 in (1,070 mm) Cape | 1904 |
| SAR Class GA | 2-6-0+0-6-2 | 3 ft 6 in (1,070 mm) Cape | 1921 |
| SAR Class GB | 2-6-2+2-6-2 | 3 ft 6 in (1,070 mm) Cape | 1921 |
| SAR Class GC | 2-6-2+2-6-2 | 3 ft 6 in (1,070 mm) Cape | 1924 |
| SAR Class GCA | 2-6-2+2-6-2 | 3 ft 6 in (1,070 mm) Cape | 1927 |
| SAR Class GD | 2-6-2+2-6-2 | 3 ft 6 in (1,070 mm) Cape | 1925 |
| SAR Class GDA | 2-6-2+2-6-2 | 3 ft 6 in (1,070 mm) Cape | 1929 |
| SAR Class GE | 2-8-2+2-8-2 | 3 ft 6 in (1,070 mm) Cape | 1925 |
| SAR Class GEA | 4-8-2+2-8-4 | 3 ft 6 in (1,070 mm) Cape | 1946 |
| SAR Class GF | 4-6-2+2-6-4 | 3 ft 6 in (1,070 mm) Cape | 1927 |
| SAR Class GG | 2-6-2+2-6-2 | 3 ft 6 in (1,070 mm) Cape | 1925 |
| SAR Class GH | 4-6-2+2-6-4 | 3 ft 6 in (1,070 mm) Cape | 1928 |
| SAR Class GK | 2-6-2+2-6-2 | 3 ft 6 in (1,070 mm) Cape | 1923 |
| SAR Class GL | 4-8-2+2-8-4 | 3 ft 6 in (1,070 mm) Cape | 1929 |
| SAR Class GM | 4-8-2+2-8-4 | 3 ft 6 in (1,070 mm) Cape | 1938 |
| SAR Class GMA & GMAM | 4-8-2+2-8-4 | 3 ft 6 in (1,070 mm) Cape | 1954 |
| SAR Class GO | 4-8-2+2-8-4 | 3 ft 6 in (1,070 mm) Cape | 1954 |
| SAR Class U | 2-6-2+2-6-2 | 3 ft 6 in (1,070 mm) Cape | 1927 |
| SAR NG 0-4-0T | 0-4-0T | 2 ft 0 in (610 mm) Narrow | 1899 |
| SAR Dutton tractors | 4-2-0 & 4-2-4 | 2 ft 0 in (610 mm) Narrow | 1923 |
| SAR Class NG1 | 0-4-0T | 1 ft 11 5/8 in (600 mm) Otavi | 1900 |
| SAR Class NG2 | 0-4-2T | 1 ft 11 5/8 in (600 mm) Otavi | 1897 |
| SAR Class NG3 | 4-6-2T | 2 ft 0 in (610 mm) Narrow | 1907 |
| SAR Class NG4 | 4-6-2T | 2 ft 0 in (610 mm) Narrow | 1911 |
| SAR Class NG5 | 2-8-2 | 1 ft 11 5/8 in (600 mm) Otavi | 1922 |
| SAR Class NG6 | 4-4-0 | 2 ft 0 in (610 mm) Narrow | 1895 |
| SAR Class NG7 | 2-6-0 | 2 ft 0 in (610 mm) Narrow | 1902 |
| SAR Class NG8 | 4-6-0 | 2 ft 0 in (610 mm) Narrow | 1904 |
| SAR Class NG9 | 4-6-0 | 2 ft 0 in (610 mm) Narrow | 1915 |
| SAR Class NG10 | 4-6-2 | 2 ft 0 in (610 mm) Narrow | 1916 |
| SAR Class NG G11 | 2-6-0+0-6-2 | 2 ft 0 in (610 mm) Narrow | 1919 |
| SAR Class NG G12 | 2-6-2+2-6-2 | 2 ft 0 in (610 mm) Narrow | 1927 |
| SAR Class NG G13 | 2-6-2+2-6-2 | 2 ft 0 in (610 mm) Narrow | 1927 |
| SAR Class NG G14 | 2-6-2+2-6-2 | 2 ft 0 in (610 mm) Narrow | 1931 |
| SAR Class NG15 | 2-8-2 | 2 ft 0 in (610 mm) Narrow | 1931 |
| SAR Class NG G16 | 2-6-2+2-6-2 | 2 ft 0 in (610 mm) Narrow | 1937 |
| ACR Class NG G16A | 2-6-2+2-6-2 | 2 ft 0 in (610 mm) Narrow | 1989 |

== Electric locomotives ==
| Class | Imperial classification | Type & Voltage | First Run |
|---|---|---|---|
| SAR Class ES | Bo+Bo | SAR 3 kV DC | 1936 |
| SAR Class ES1 | Bo | EE 235 V DC | 1924 |
| SAR Class Exp AC | Bo-Bo | SAR 25 kV AC | 1978 |
| SAR Class 1E & 1ES | Bo+Bo | MV 3 kV DC | 1925 |
| SAR Class 2E | Bo+Bo | Henschel 3 kV DC | 1937 |
| SAR Class 3E | Co+Co | MV 3 kV DC | 1947 |
| SAR Class 4E | 1Co+Co1 | GEC 3 kV DC | 1952 |
| SAR Class 5E, Series 1 | Bo-Bo | EE 3 kV DC | 1955 |
| SAR Class 5E, Series 2 | Bo-Bo | EE 3 kV DC | 1957 |
| SAR Class 5E, Series 3 | Bo-Bo | EE 3 kV DC | 1958 |
| SAR Class 5E1, Series 1 | Bo-Bo | MV 3 kV DC | 1959 |
| SAR Class 5E1, Series 2 | Bo-Bo | MV 3 kV DC | 1963 |
| SAR Class 5E1, Series 3 | Bo-Bo | MV 3 kV DC | 1964 |
| SAR Class 5E1, Series 4 | Bo-Bo | MV 3 kV DC | 1965 |
| SAR Class 5E1, Series 5 | Bo-Bo | MV 3 kV DC | 1966 |
| SAR Class 6E | Bo-Bo | UCW 3 kV DC | 1970 |
| SAR Class 6E1, Series 1 | Bo-Bo | UCW 3 kV DC | 1969 |
| SAR Class 6E1, Series 2 | Bo-Bo | UCW 3 kV DC | 1971 |
| SAR Class 6E1, Series 3 | Bo-Bo | UCW 3 kV DC | 1971 |
| SAR Class 6E1, Series 4 | Bo-Bo | UCW 3 kV DC | 1973 |
| SAR Class 6E1, Series 5 | Bo-Bo | UCW 3 kV DC | 1974 |
| SAR Class 6E1, Series 6 | Bo-Bo | UCW 3 kV DC | 1975 |
| SAR Class 6E1, Series 7 | Bo-Bo | UCW 3 kV DC | 1977 |
| SAR Class 6E1, Series 8 | Bo-Bo | UCW 3 kV DC | 1979 |
| SAR Class 6E1, Series 9 | Bo-Bo | UCW 3 kV DC | 1981 |
| SAR Class 6E1, Series 10 | Bo-Bo | UCW 3 kV DC | 1982 |
| SAR Class 6E1, Series 11 | Bo-Bo | UCW 3 kV DC | 1984 |
| SAR Class 7E | Co-Co | 50 ^{c}/_{s} Group 25 kV AC | 1978 |
| SAR Class 7E1 | Co-Co | Hitachi 25 kV AC | 1980 |
| SAR Class 7E2, Series 1 | Co-Co | 50 ^{c}/_{s} Group 25 kV AC | 1982 |
| SAR Class 7E2, Series 2 | Co-Co | 50 ^{c}/_{s} Group 25 kV AC | 1983 |
| SAR Class 7E3, Series 1 | Co-Co | Hitachi 25 kV AC | 1983 |
| SAR Class 7E3, Series 2 | Co-Co | Hitachi 25 kV AC | 1984 |
| Spoornet Class 7E4 | Co-Co | Hitachi 25 kV AC | 2000 |
| SAR Class 8E | Bo-Bo | BBC-Siemens 3 kV DC | 1983 |
| SAR Class 9E, Series 1 | Co-Co | GEC 50 kV AC | 1978 |
| SAR Class 9E, Series 2 | Co-Co | GEC 50 kV AC | 1982 |
| SAR Class 10E | Co-Co | Toshiba 3 kV DC | 1985 |
| SAR Class 10E1, Series 1 | Co-Co | GEC 3 kV DC | 1987 |
| SAR Class 10E1, Series 2 | Co-Co | GEC 3 kV DC | 1990 |
| SAR Class 10E2 | Co-Co | Toshiba 3 kV DC | 1989 |
| SAR Class 11E | Co-Co | GM GM5FC 25 kV AC | 1985 |
| SAR Class 12E | Bo-Bo | UCW 3 kV DC | 1983 |
| Spoornet Class 14E | Bo-Bo | 50 ^{c}/_{s} Group 3 kV DC/25 kV AC | 1991 |
| Spoornet Class 14E1 | Bo-Bo | 50 ^{c}/_{s} Group 3 kV DC/25 kV AC | 1994 |
| TFR Class 15E | Co-Co | Mitsui-Toshiba 50 kV AC | 2010 |
| Spoornet Class 16E | Bo-Bo | UCW 3 kV DC | 1990 |
| Spoornet Class 17E | Bo-Bo | UCW 3 kV DC | 1993 |
| Spoornet Class 18E, Series 1 | Bo-Bo | Transwerk 3 kV DC | 2000 |
| TFR Class 18E, Series 2 | Bo-Bo | TRE 3 kV DC | 2010 |
| TFR Class 19E | Bo-Bo | Mitsui-Toshiba 3 kV DC/25 kV AC | 2009 |
| TFR Class 20E | Bo-Bo | CSR ZELC 3 kV DC/25 kV AC | 2013 |
| TFR Class 21E | Bo-Bo | CSR ZELC 3 kV DC/25 kV AC | 2014 |
| TFR Class 22E | Co-Co | CSR ZELC 3 kV DC/25 kV AC | 2015 |
| TFR Class 23E | Co-Co | Bombardier Transportation Inc. 3 kV DC/25 kV AC | 2017 |
| Anglo Class E38 | Bo-Bo | Consortium 3 kV DC | 1993 |

== Gas-electric, Diesel-electric, Diesel-hydraulic & Electro-diesel locomotives ==
| Class | Imperial classification | Type | First Run | Total produced |
|---|---|---|---|---|
| SAR Gas-electric | A1-1A | SAR GE1 | 1923 | 1 |
| SAR Class DS | Bo-Bo | AEG | 1939 | 1 |
| SAR Class DS1 | Co | AEG | 1939 | 2 |
| SAR Class 31-000 | Bo+Bo | GE U12B | 1958 | 48 |
| SAR Class 32-000 | 1Co+Co1 | GE U18C1 | 1959 | 115 |
| SAR Class 32-200 | 1Co+Co1 | GE U20C1 | 1966 | 10 |
| SAR Class 33-000 | Co+Co | GE U20C | 1965 | 65 |
| SAR Class 33-200 | Co+Co | GM-EMD GL26MC | 1966 | 20 |
| SAR Class 33-400 | Co+Co | GE U20C | 1968 | 115 |
| SAR Class 34-000 | Co+Co | GE U26C | 1971 | 125 |
| SAR Class 34-200 | Co+Co | GM-EMD GT26MC | 1971 | 50 |
| SAR Class 34-400 | Co+Co | GE U26C | 1973 | 100 |
| SAR Class 34-500 | Co-Co | GE U26C | 1974 | 46 |
| SAR Class 34-600 | Co+Co | GM-EMD GT26MC | 1974 | 100 |
| SAR Class 34-800 | Co+Co | GM-EMD GT26MC | 1978 | 59 |
| SAR Class 34-900 | Co+Co | GE U26C | 1979 | 30 |
| SAR Class 35-000 | Co+Co | GE U15C | 1972 | 70 |
| SAR Class 35-200 | Co+Co | GM-EMD GT18MC | 1974 | 151 |
| SAR Class 35-400 | Co+Co | GE U15C | 1976 | 100 |
| SAR Class 35-600 | Co+Co | GM-EMD GT18MC | 1976 | 101 |
| TFR Class 35-800 | Co-Co | GM-EMD GL26C-2 | 1982 | 14 |
| SAR Class 36-000 | Bo+Bo | GE SG10B | 1975 | 124 |
| SAR Class 36-200 | Bo+Bo | GM-EMD SW1002 | 1980 | 107 |
| SAR Class 37-000 | Co+Co | GM-EMD GT26M2C | 1981 | 100 |
| Spoornet Class 38-000 | Bo-Bo | Consortium 3 kV DC | 1992 | 50 |
| Spoornet Class 39-000 | Co+Co | EMD GT26CU-3 | 2006 | 5 |
| TFR Class 39-200 | Co+Co | EMD GT26CU-3 | 2010 | 50 |
| TFR Class 43-000 | Co+Co | GE C30Aci | 2011 | 203 |
| TFR Class 44-000 | Co-Co | GE ES40ACi | 2015 | 233 |
| TFR Class 45-000 | Co-Co | China CNR | 2015 | 359 |
| SAR Class 61-000 | B-B | Henschel DH-1420 | 1958 | 7 |
| SAR Class 91-000 | Bo-Bo | GE UM6B | 1973 | 20 |
| PRASA Class Afro 4000 | Co-Co | Vossloh España Afro4000 | 2014 | 20 |

== See also ==
Rail transport and locomotives in South Africa

- South African locomotive history
- Rail transport in South Africa
- South African locomotive numbering and classification

Preservation

- Outeniqua Transport Museum
- Sandstone Estates
- Umgeni Steam Railway
- Rovos Rail

Locomotives and rolling stock

- List of locomotive builders
- List of railway vehicles
