= South African Class 23E =

Type of electric locomotive

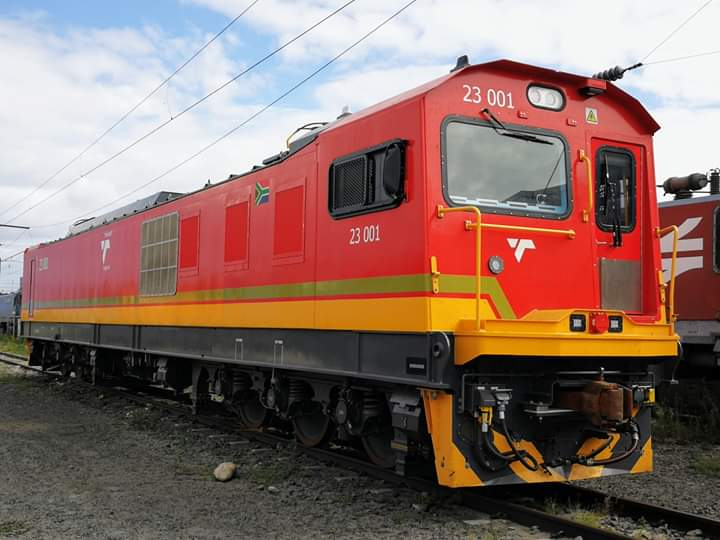
Type and origin
- Power type: Electric
- Designer: Bombardier Transportation
- Builder: Transnet Engineering
- Build date: 2017-
- Total produced: 240
Specifications
- Configuration
  - AAR: C-C
  - UIC: Co'Co'
  - Commonwealth: Co-Co
- Gauge: 3 ft 6 in (1,067 mm) Cape gauge
- Wheelbase
  - Bogie: 3.7 m
- Width: 2.9 m
- Height
  - Pantograph: 4.138 m
- Axle load: 22,000 kg
- Loco weight: 132 t
- Electric system/s: Dual 3 kV DC & 25 kV AC/50 Hz catenary
- Current pickup(s): Pantographs
- Traction motors: Six Mitrac TM 3900 N (6FRA 8240)
- MU working: 8
- Loco brake: Electro-pneumatic, regenerative & rheostatic
- Train brakes: Air
- Couplers: AAR knuckle
Performance figures
- Maximum speed: 100 km/h
- Tractive effort: 3800 kW
Career
- Operators: Transnet Freight Rail
- Class: 23E
- Number in class: 240
- Numbers: 23-001 to 23-240
- Delivered: 2018-
- First run: 2018

The Transnet Freight Rail Class 23E of 2017 is a South African electric locomotive.

== Manufacturers ==
The TRAXX Africa F100 MS TFR Class 23E Locomotive is a Co-Co, electrical, multi system freight locomotive designed to operate under 3 kV DC and 25 kV AC catenary voltages on 3 ft 6 in (1,067 mm) Cape gauge track.

The acquisition of the Class 23E forms part of the largest-ever locomotive supply contract in South African history and the single-biggest investment initiative by a South African corporation. It consists of contracts for the construction of 1,064 locomotives by four global original equipment manufacturers:

- CSR Zhuzhou Electric Locomotive Company, for 359 Class 22E dual-voltage electric locomotives.
- Bombardier Transportation South Africa, for 240 Class 23E dual-voltage electric locomotives.
- General Electric South Africa Technologies (a unit of the U.S.-based GE Transportation), for 233 Class 44-000 diesel-electric locomotives.
- CNR Rolling Stock South Africa (Pty.) Ltd., for 232 Class 45-000 diesel-electric locomotives.
