= South African Class 45-000 =

Locomotive class

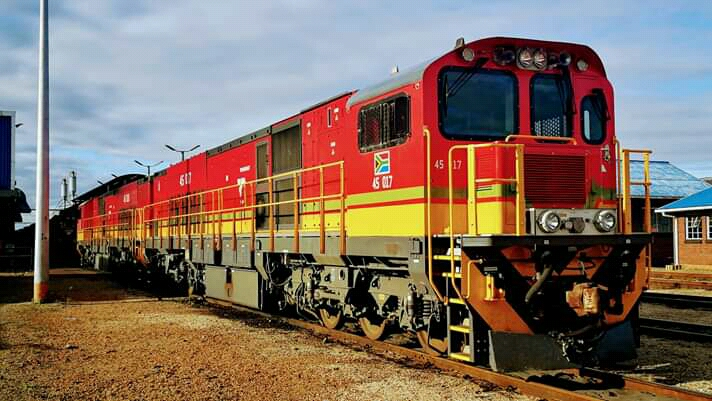
Type and origin
- Power type: Diesel-electric
- Builder: Transnet Engineering
- Build date: 2017-
- Total produced: 232
Specifications
- Configuration
  - AAR: C-C
  - UIC: Co'Co'
  - Commonwealth: Co-Co
- Gauge: 3 ft 6 in (1,067 mm) Cape gauge
- Fuel type: Diesel
- Prime mover: MTU 4000 20V R63L
- Loco brake: Air & Dynamic
- Train brakes: Air & Vacuum
- Safety systems: Loco-cam
- Couplers: AAR knuckle
Career
- Operators: Transnet Freight Rail
- Class: Class 45-000
- Number in class: 232
- Numbers: 45-001 to 45-232
- Delivered: 2017-
- First run: 2018

The Transnet Freight Rail Class 45-000 of 2015 is a South African diesel-electric locomotive.

== Manufacturers ==
The acquisition of the Class 45-000 forms part of the largest-ever locomotive supply contract in South African history and the single-biggest investment initiative by a South African corporation. It consists of contracts for the construction of 1,064 locomotives by four global original equipment manufacturers:

- General Electric South Africa Technologies (a unit of the U.S.-based GE Transportation) for 233 Class 44-000 diesel-electric locomotives.
- CNR Rolling Stock South Africa (Pty.) Ltd. for 232 Class 45-000 diesel-electric locomotives.
- CSR Zhuzhou Electric Locomotive Company for 359 Class 22E dual-voltage electric locomotives.
- Bombardier Transportation South Africa for 240 Class 23E dual-voltage electric locomotives.

== Illustration ==
All the Class 45-000 locomotives were delivered in red TFR livery.
