= South African Class 10E2 =

1989 design of electric locomotive

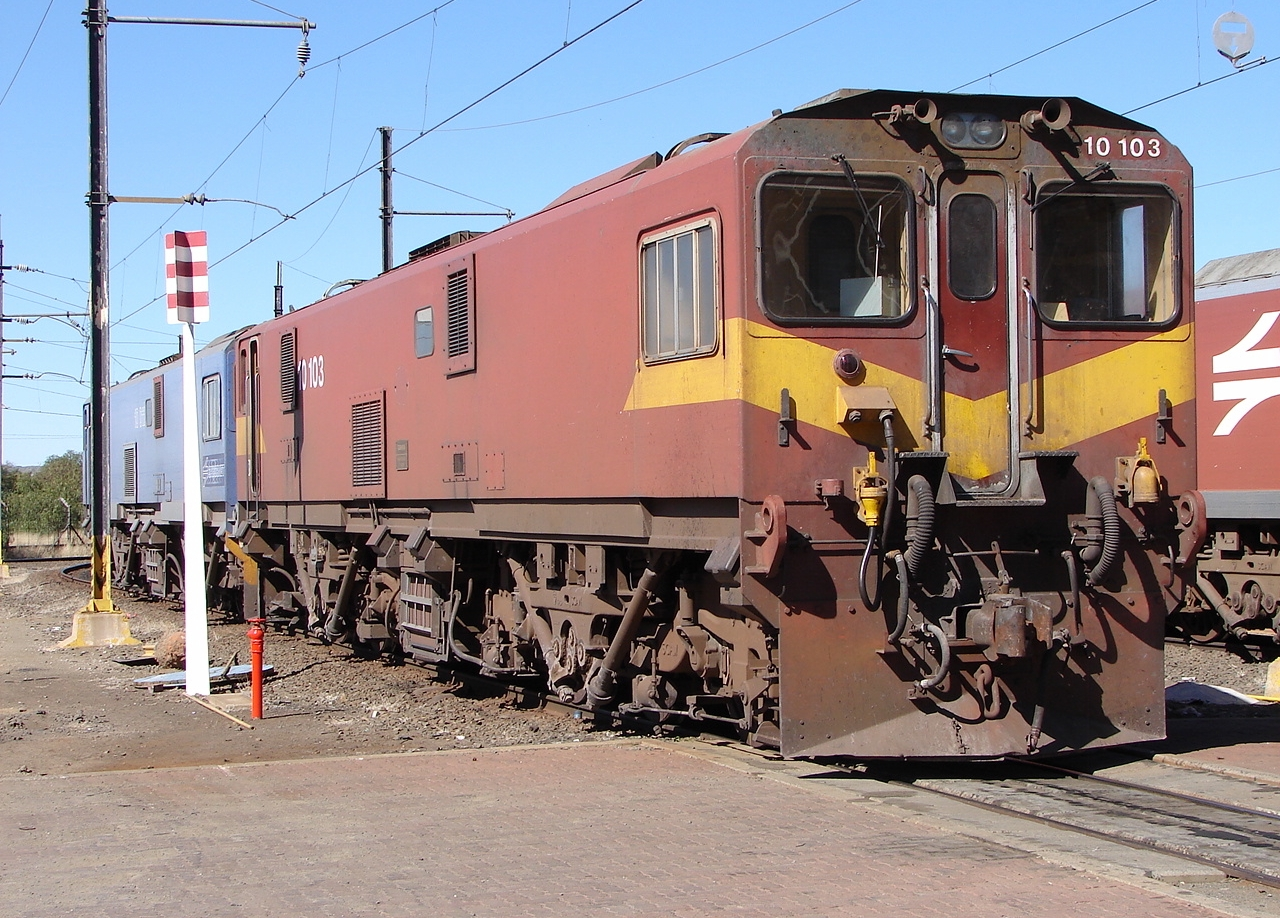
- No. 10-103 at Beaconsfield, 18 September 2009
Type and origin
- Power type: Electric
- Designer: Toshiba
- Builder: Union Carriage & Wagon
- Model: Toshiba 10E2
- Build date: 1989
- Total produced: 25
Specifications
- Configuration
  - AAR: C-C
  - UIC: Co'Co'
  - Commonwealth: Co-Co
- Gauge: 3 ft 6 in (1,067 mm) Cape gauge
- Wheel diameter: 1,220 mm (48.03 in)
- Wheelbase: 13,460 mm (44 ft 1 7/8 in)
  - Bogie: 4,060 mm (13 ft 3 7/8 in)
- Pivot centres: 10,200 mm (33 ft 5 5/8 in)
- Panto shoes: 12,000 mm (39 ft 4 1/2 in)
- Length
  - Over couplers: 18,520 mm (60 ft 9 1/8 in)
  - Over body: 17,506 mm (57 ft 5 1/4 in)
- Height
  - Pantograph: 4,120 mm (13 ft 6 1/4 in)
  - Body height: 3,945 mm (12 ft 11 3/8 in)
- Axle load: 21,210 kg (46,760 lb)
- Adhesive weight: 125,000 kg (276,000 lb)
- Loco weight: 125,000 kg (276,000 lb)
- Electric system/s: 3 kV DC catenary
- Current pickup(s): Pantographs
- Traction motors: Six SE-218
  - Rating 1 hour: 540 kW (720 hp)
  - Continuous: 515 kW (691 hp)
- Gear ratio: 19:92
- Loco brake: Air, Regenerative & Rheostatic
- Train brakes: Air & Vacuum
- Couplers: AAR knuckle
Performance figures
- Maximum speed: 90 km/h (56 mph)
- Power output
  - 1 hour: 3,240 kW (4,340 hp)
  - Continuous: 3,090 kW (4,140 hp)
- Tractive effort
  - Starting: 450 kN (100,000 lbf)
  - 1 hour: 335 kN (75,000 lbf)
  - Continuous: 310 kN (70,000 lbf) @ 35 km/h (22 mph)
Career
- Operators: South African Railways; Spoornet; Transnet Freight Rail
- Class: Class 10E2
- Number in class: 25
- Numbers: 10-101 to 10-125
- Nicknames: Breadbin
- Delivered: 1989–1990
- First run: 1989

The South African Railways Class 10E2 of 1989 is an electric locomotive.

In 1989 and 1990, the South African Railways placed twenty-five Class 10E2 electric locomotives with a Co-Co wheel arrangement in mainline service.

== Manufacturer ==
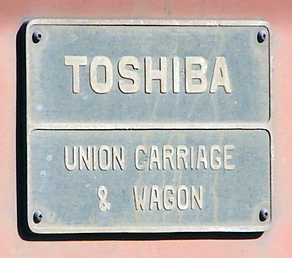
Builder's plate

The 3 kV DC Class 10E2 electric locomotive was designed for the South African Railways (SAR) by Toshiba and built by Union Carriage and Wagon (UCW) in Nigel, Transvaal. Toshiba of Japan supplied the electrical equipment while UCW was responsible for the mechanical components and assembly.

UCW delivered twenty-five locomotives to the SAR in 1989 and 1990, numbered in the range from 10-101 to 10-125. The company did not allocate builder’s numbers to the locomotives it built for the SAR, but used the SAR unit numbers for their record keeping.

== Characteristics ==
The Class 10E2 was introduced as a standard 3 kV DC heavy goods locomotive. With a continuous power rating of 3,090 kilowatts (4,140 horsepower), four Class 10E2 locomotives are capable of performing the same work as six Class 6E1.

=== Brakes ===
The locomotive makes use of either regenerative or rheostatic braking, as the situation demands. Both traction and electric braking power are continuously variable, with the electric braking optimised to such an extent that maximum use will be made of the regenerative braking capacity of the 3 kV DC network, with the ability to automatically change over to rheostatic braking whenever the overhead supply system becomes non-receptive.

The entire fleet of the Class 10E family of electric locomotives is equipped with electronic chopper control, which is smoother in comparison to the rheostatic resistance control which was used in the Classes 1E to 6E1 electric locomotives.

=== Bogies ===
The Class 10E2 was built with sophisticated traction linkages on the bogies. Together with the locomotive's electronic wheel-slip detection system, these traction struts, mounted between the linkages on the bogies and the locomotive body and colloquially referred to as grasshopper legs, ensure the maximum transfer of power to the rails without causing wheel-slip by reducing the adhesion of the leading bogie and increasing that of the trailing bogie by as much as 15% upon starting.

=== Orientation ===
These dual cab locomotives have a roof access ladder on one side only, just to the right of the cab access door. The roof access ladder end is marked as the no. 2 end.

=== Identifying features ===
In visual appearance, the Class 10E2 can be distinguished from the Class 10E by the roof ends and the sills. The Class 10E has riffled roof ends and parts of the sill protrude slightly past the bottom edge of the body sides. The Class 10E2 has smooth unriffled roof ends and no part of the sill protrudes past the bottom edge of the body sides.

== Service ==
The Class 10E2 is mainly employed to haul ore trains on the line between Kimberley and Hotazel in the Northern Cape. It also works between Kimberley and the Witwatersrand. Most were initially shedded at Kaserne near Johannesburg with several also at Beaconsfield near Kimberley.

In 1998, a number of Spoornet's electric locomotives and most of their Class 38-000 electro-diesel locomotives were sold to Maquarie-GETX (General Electric Financing) and leased back to Spoornet for a ten-year period which was to expire in 2008. Of the Class 10E2, numbers 10-106 to 10-125 were later also included in this leasing deal.

== Liveries ==
All the Class 10E2 locomotives were delivered in the SAR red oxide livery with signal red buffer beams and cowcatchers and a yellow V stripe on the ends, folded over to a horizontal stripe below the side windows. The number plates on the sides were mounted without the traditional three-stripe yellow wings. In the late 1990s many were repainted in the Spoornet blue livery with outline numbers on the long hood sides. After 2008 in the Transnet Freight Rail (TFR) era, several received the TFR red, green and yellow livery.

On Class 10E2 units which were repainted in Transnet Freight Rail livery from c. 2011, the locomotive numbers are displayed as, for example, either "E10110" or "E10 125", instead of the earlier "10-110".

== Illustration ==
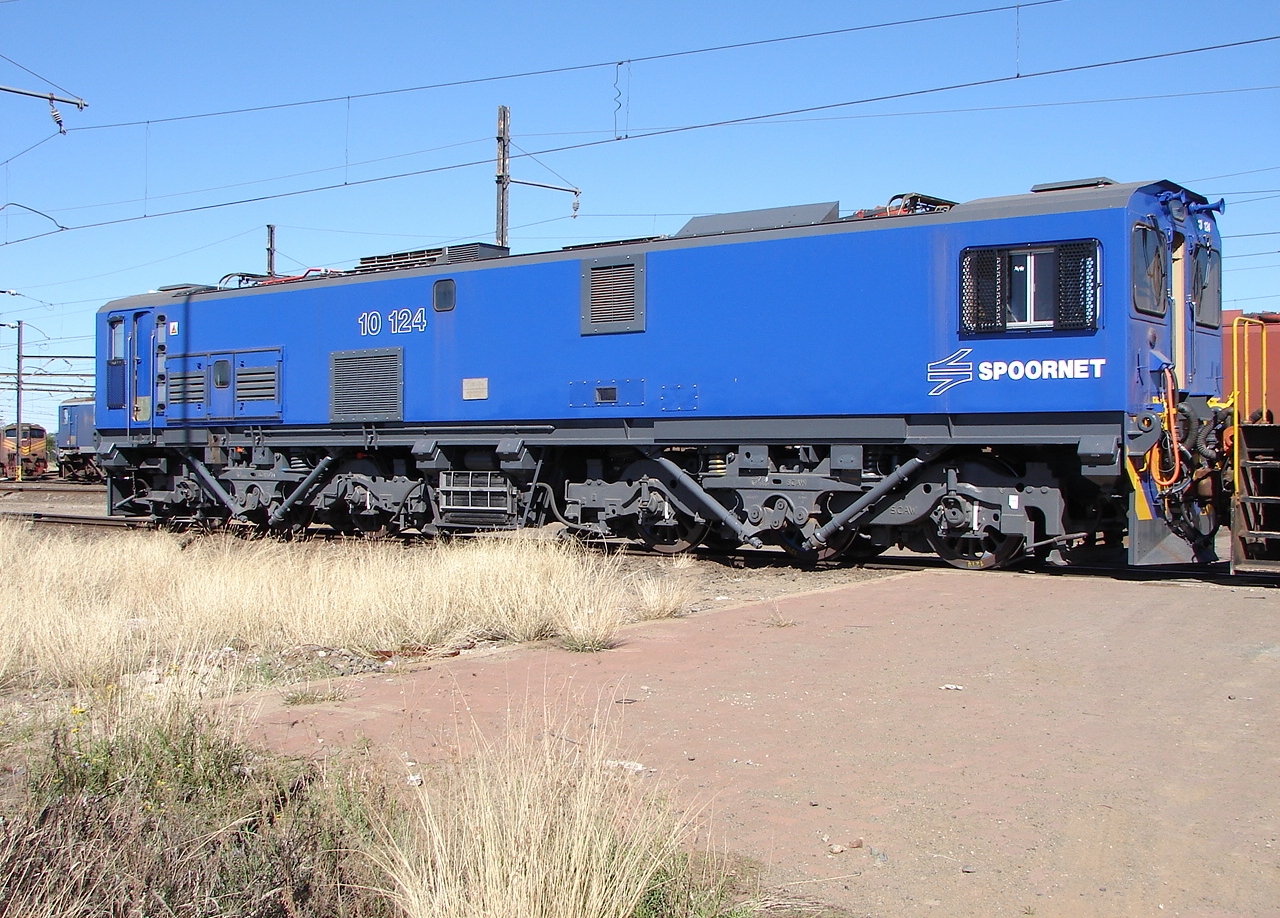
No. 10-124 in Spoornet blue livery with outline numbers at Beaconsfield, 18 September 2009

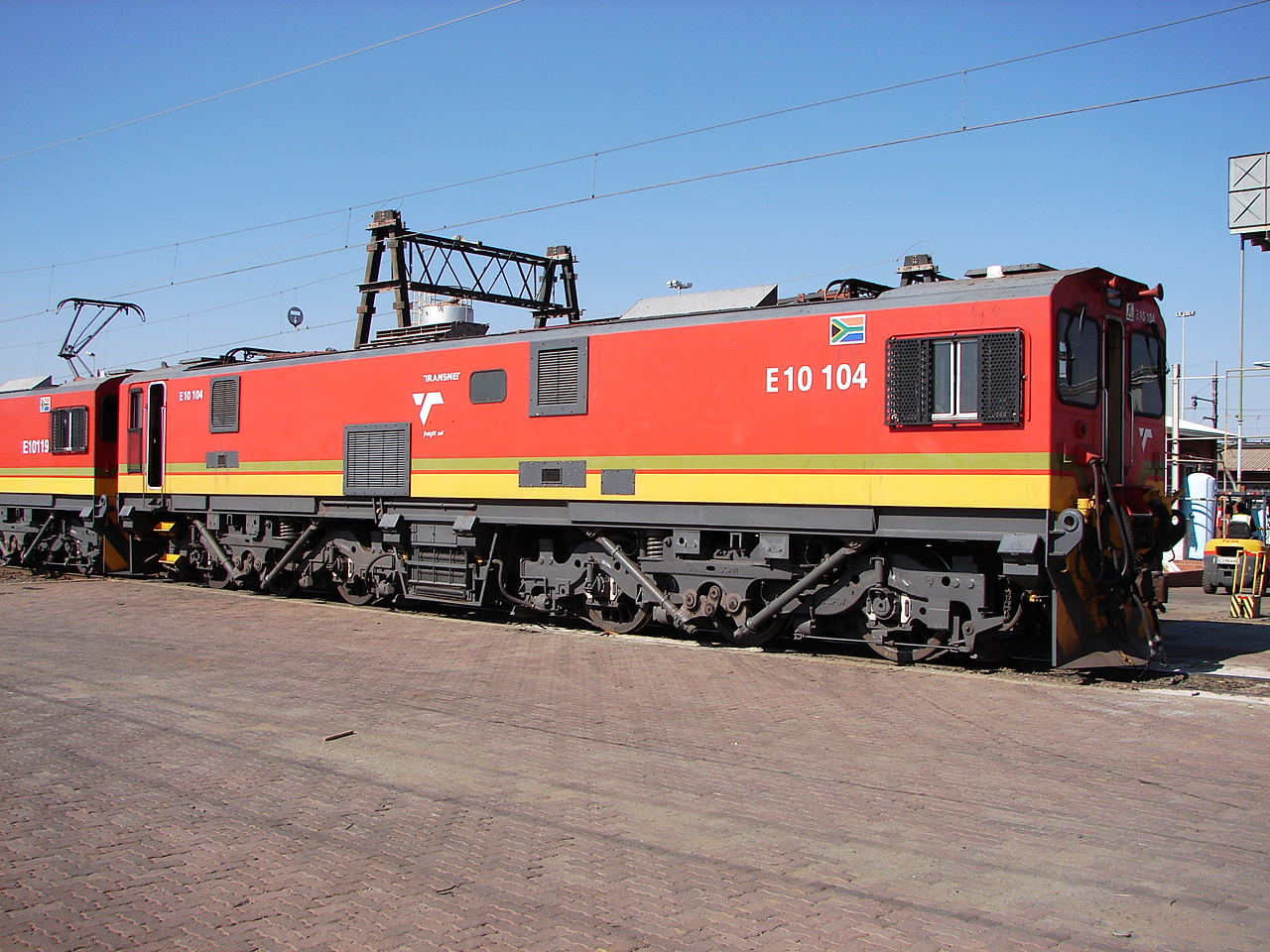
No. 10-104 in Transnet Freight Rail livery, inscribed "E10 104", Beaconsfield, Kimberley, 24 May 2013

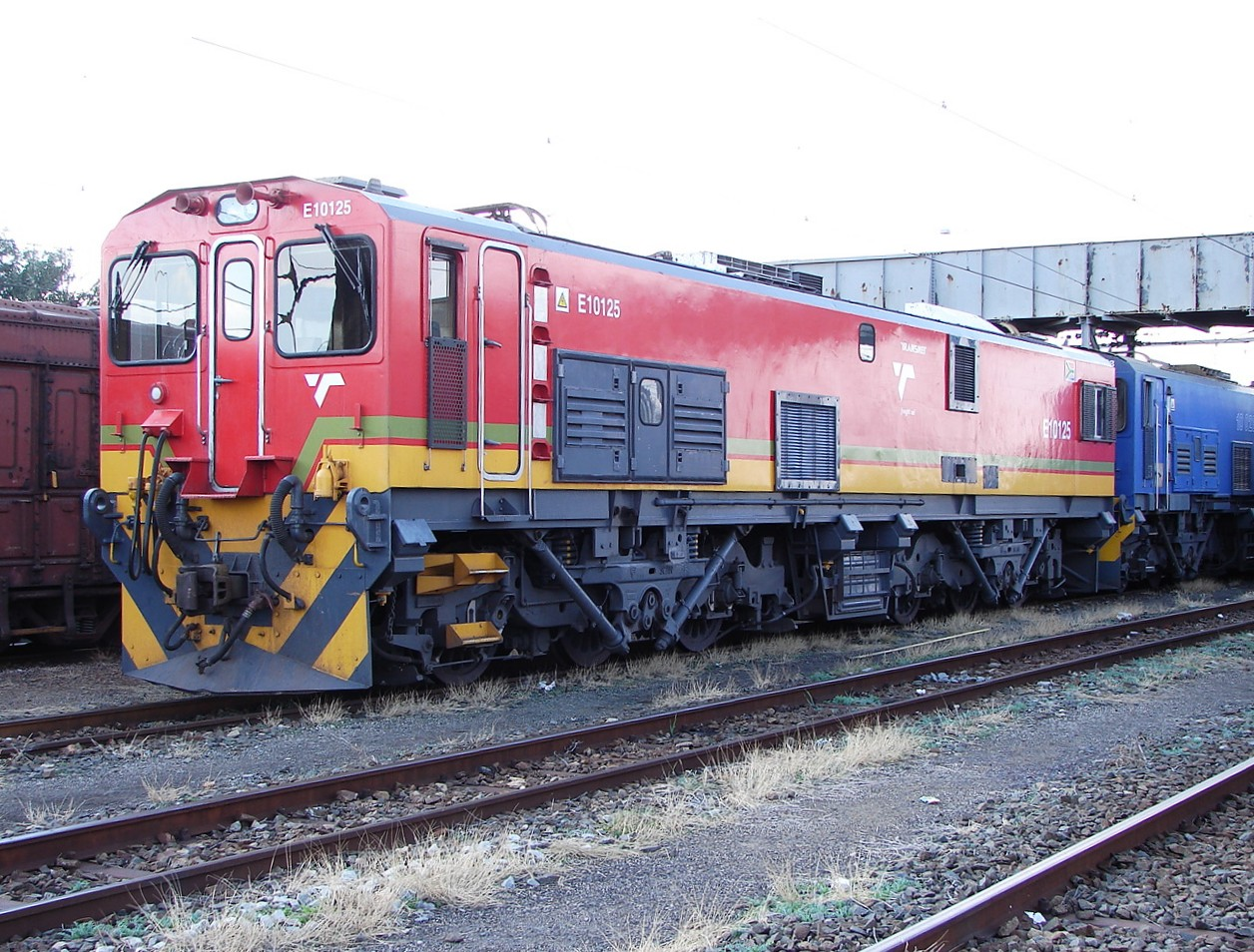
No. 10-125 in Transnet Freight Rail livery, inscribed "E10125", Warrenton, Northern Cape, 21 May 2013
