= South African Class K 4-6-4T =

1917 design of steam locomotive

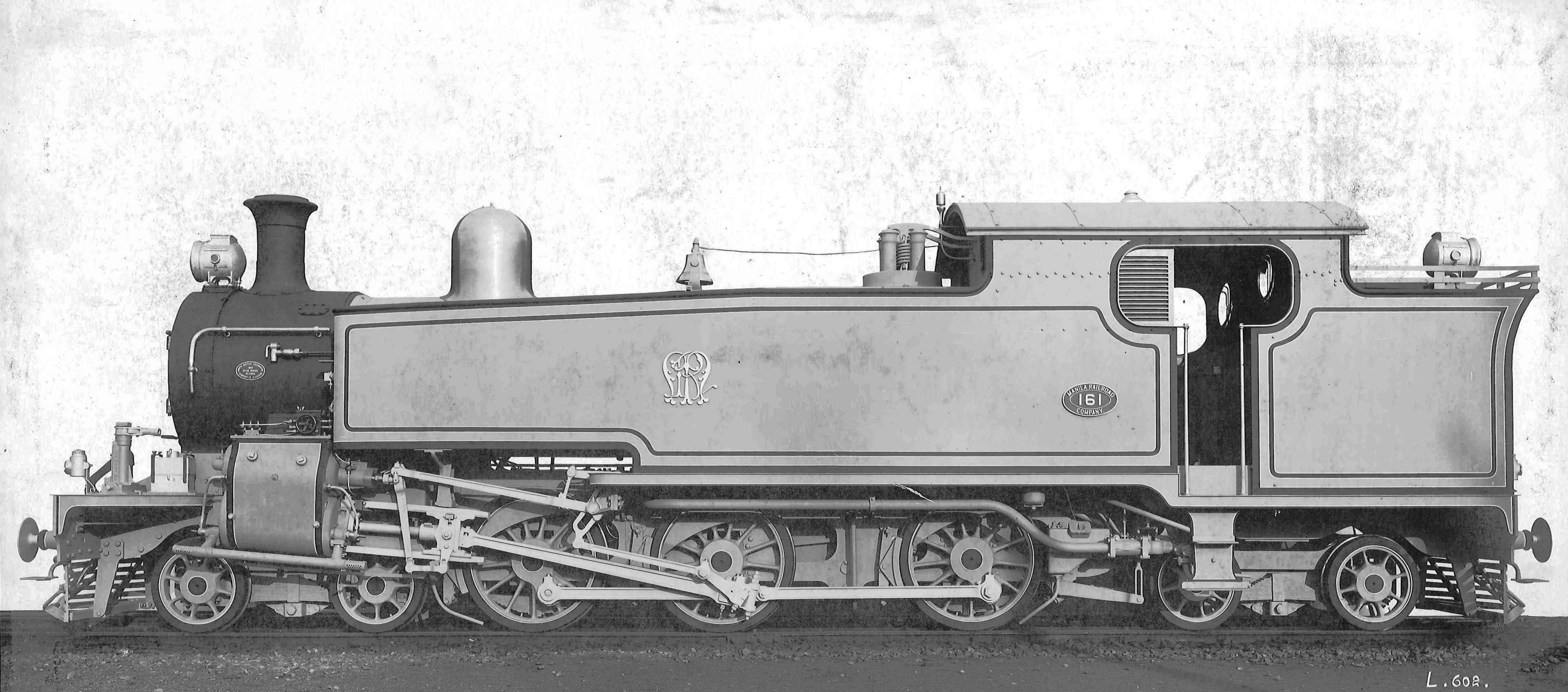
- Manila Railroad Company no. 161, possibly Class K no. 347, c. 1914
Type and origin
- Power type: Steam
- Designer: North British Locomotive Company
- Builder: North British Locomotive Company
- Serial number: 20854-20860
- Model: Manila Railroad Company 4-6-4T
- Build date: 1914
- Total produced: 7
Specifications
- Configuration
  - Whyte: 4-6-4T (Baltic)
  - UIC: 2'C2'h2t
- Driver: 2nd coupled axle
- Gauge: 3 ft 6 in (1,067 mm) Cape gauge
- Leading dia.: 31 1/2 in (800 mm)
- Coupled dia.: 48 in (1,219 mm)
- Trailing dia.: 31 1/2 in (800 mm)
- Wheelbase: 32 ft 10 1/2 in (10,020 mm)
  - Axle spacing (Asymmetrical): 1-2: 5 ft 3 in (1,600 mm); 2-3: 7 ft (2,134 mm)
  - Leading: 5 ft (1,524 mm)
  - Coupled: 12 ft 3 in (3,734 mm)
  - Trailing: 5 ft (1,524 mm)
- Length
  - Over couplers: 41 ft 7 1/2 in (12,687 mm)
- Height: 12 ft 6 in (3,810 mm)
- Frame type: Plate
- Axle load: 12 LT (12,190 kg)
  - Leading: 15 LT 14 cwt (15,950 kg)
  - Coupled: 12 LT (12,190 kg)
  - Trailing: 19 LT 4 cwt (19,510 kg)
- Adhesive weight: 36 LT (36,580 kg)
- Loco weight: 70 LT 18 cwt (72,040 kg)
- Fuel type: Coal
- Fuel capacity: 4 LT (4.1 t)
- Water cap.: 2,350 imp gal (10,700 L)
- Firebox
  - Type: Round-top
  - Grate area: 18.4 sq ft (1.71 m^{2})
- Boiler
  - Pitch: 7 ft 3 in (2,210 mm)
  - Diameter: 4 ft 1 1/2 in (1,257 mm)
  - Tube plates: 12 ft (3,658 mm)
  - Small tubes: 85: 1 7/8 in (48 mm)
  - Large tubes: 21: 5 1/4 in (133 mm)
- Boiler pressure: 160 psi (1,103 kPa)
- Safety valve: Pop
- Heating surface
  - Firebox: 118 sq ft (11.0 m^{2})
  - Tubes: 844 sq ft (78.4 m^{2})
  - Total surface: 962 sq ft (89.4 m^{2})
- Superheater
  - Heating area: 257 sq ft (23.9 m^{2})
- Cylinders: Two
- Cylinder size: 17 in (432 mm) bore 24 in (610 mm) stroke
- Valve gear: Walschaerts
- Valve type: Piston
- Couplers: Johnston link-and-pin
Performance figures
- Tractive effort: 17,340 lbf (77.1 kN) @ 75%
Career
- Operators: South African Railways
- Class: Class K
- Number in class: 7
- Numbers: 347–353
- Nicknames: Manila
- Delivered: 1917
- First run: 1917
- Withdrawn: 1938

The South African Railways Class K 4-6-4T of 1917 was a steam locomotive.

In 1917, the South African Railways placed seven Class K tank steam locomotives with a 4-6-4 Hudson type wheel arrangement in service. They had been built for the Philippines but could not be delivered due to wartime disruption.

== Manufacturer ==
Seven 4-6-4 side-tank steam locomotives were built for the Manila Railroad Company in the Philippine Islands by the North British Locomotive Company (NBL) in 1914. Because of difficulties experienced in delivering them to the Philippines during the First World War as well as a critical wartime shortage of locomotives on the South African Railways (SAR), NBL eventually offered the seven locomotives for sale to the SAR. They were purchased and delivered in 1917, designated Class K and numbered in the range from 347 to 353.

== Characteristics ==
The locomotives had inclined cylinders, arranged outside the plate frames. The piston valves were actuated by Walschaerts valve gear, while the reversing gear was controlled by a combination of hand and steam mechanism. The locomotives were superheated and their smokeboxes were equipped with Stone's Patent louvre spark arrestors. Their coupled wheel axleboxes were provided with mechanical force-feed lubrication. They were the first locomotives in South Africa to be equipped with exhaust steam injectors, which were of the Davies and Metcalfe pattern.

The only modifications required to these locomotives for them to be put to work on the SAR were to the buffing and drawgear. As built, they had 12 inches (305 millimetres) diameter "bull's eyes" acetylene gas headlamps, powered from a generator affixed to the running board on the right hand side adjoining the smokebox. The same medium was used for the cab lighting, but these lights were removed and smaller headlamps were installed.

The original works photographs showed a hand-operated bell on top of the boiler, but there is no record that the bells were still on the engines when they reached South Africa.

== Service ==
The locomotives proved to be extremely useful. They were placed in service on the Reef's suburban services, shedded at Braamfontein and working between Randfontein and Springs. They were well suited for suburban service since they were free-steaming, had rapid acceleration and were capable of relatively high speeds, even though they lacked power and speed compared with the Class 16. They remained in this service until the last of them were withdrawn and scrapped in 1938.

== Illustration ==
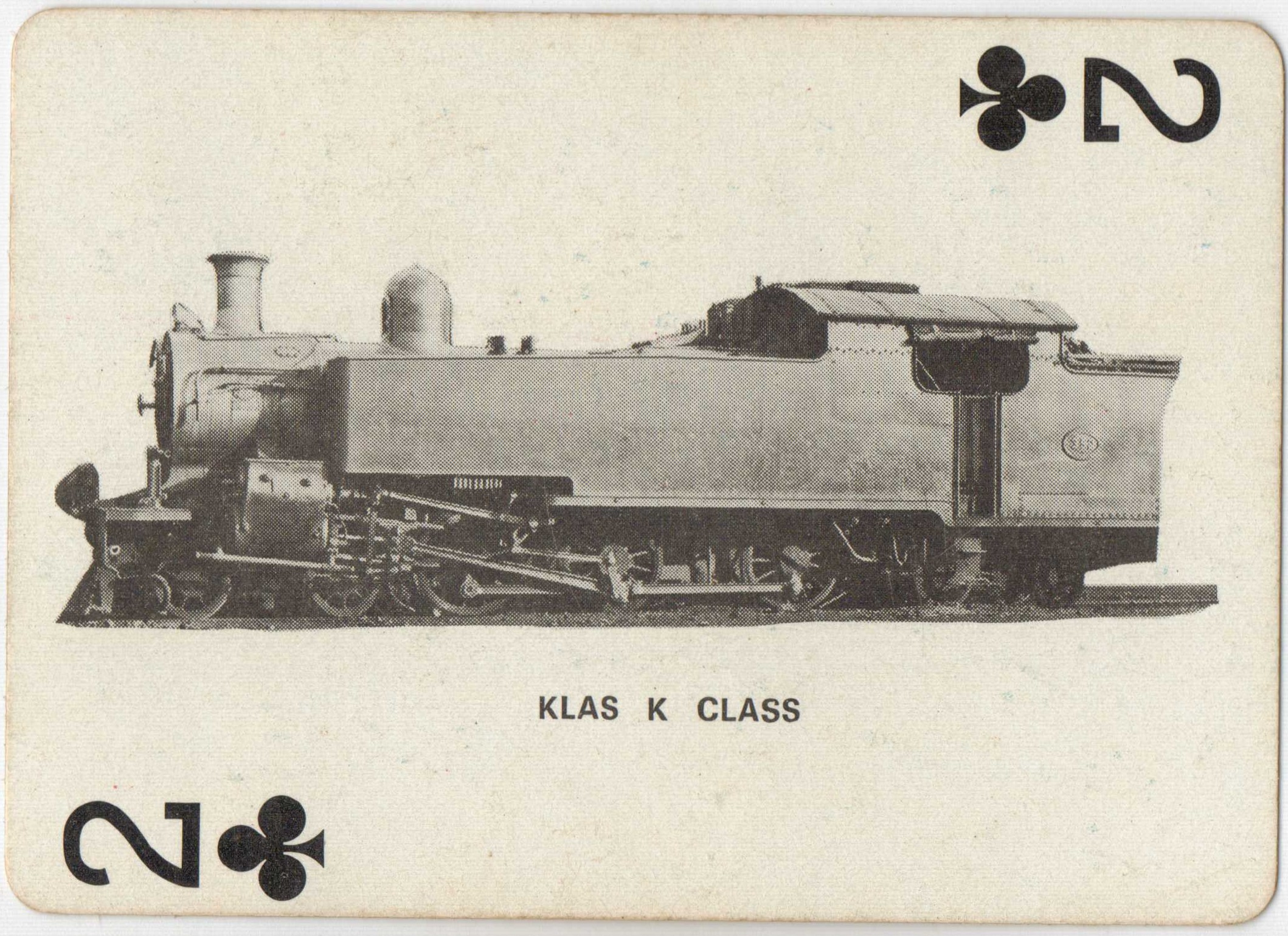

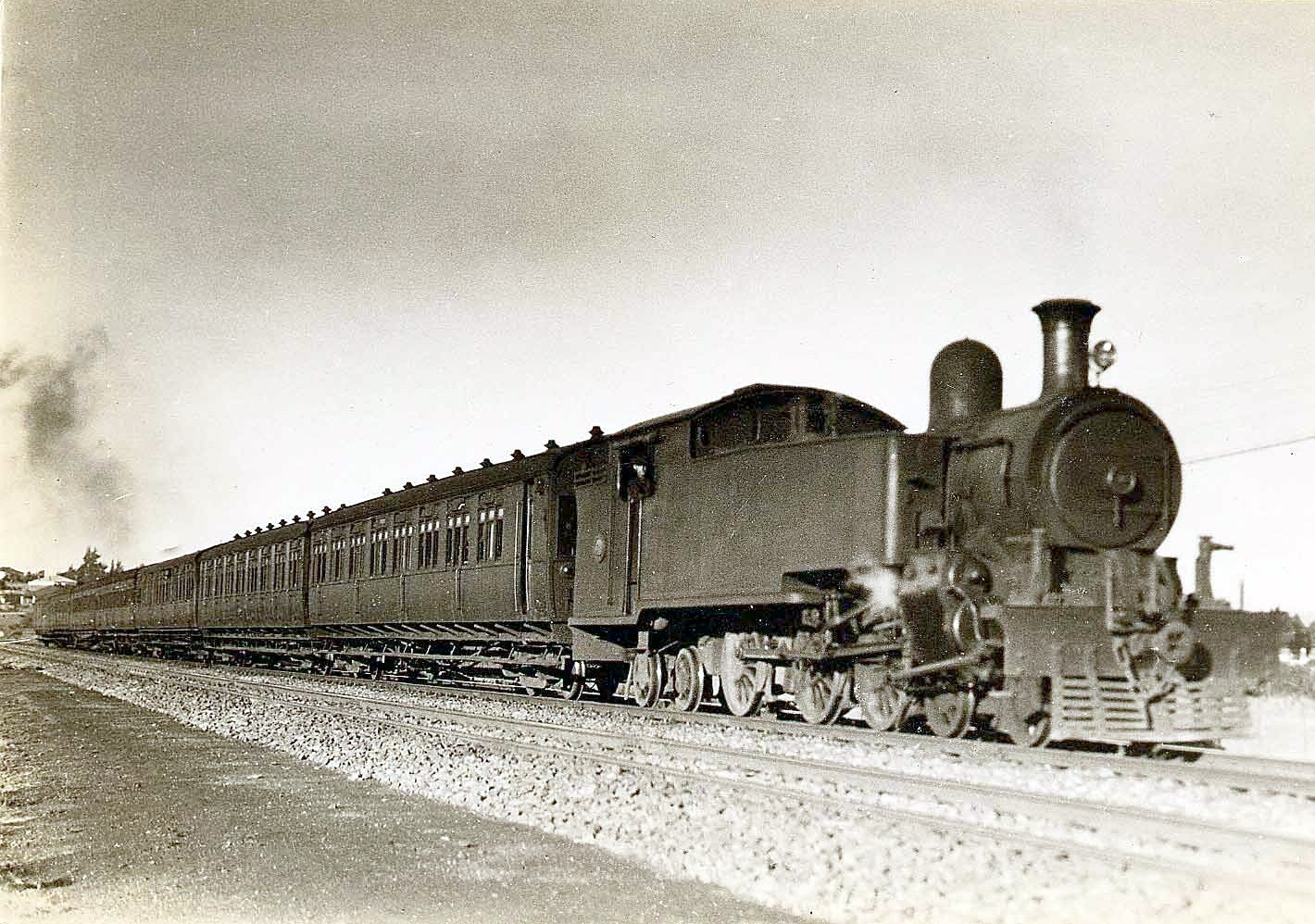
A Class K on the up suburban between Maraisburg and Florida, c. 1930
