= South African Class 22E =

South African electric locomotive

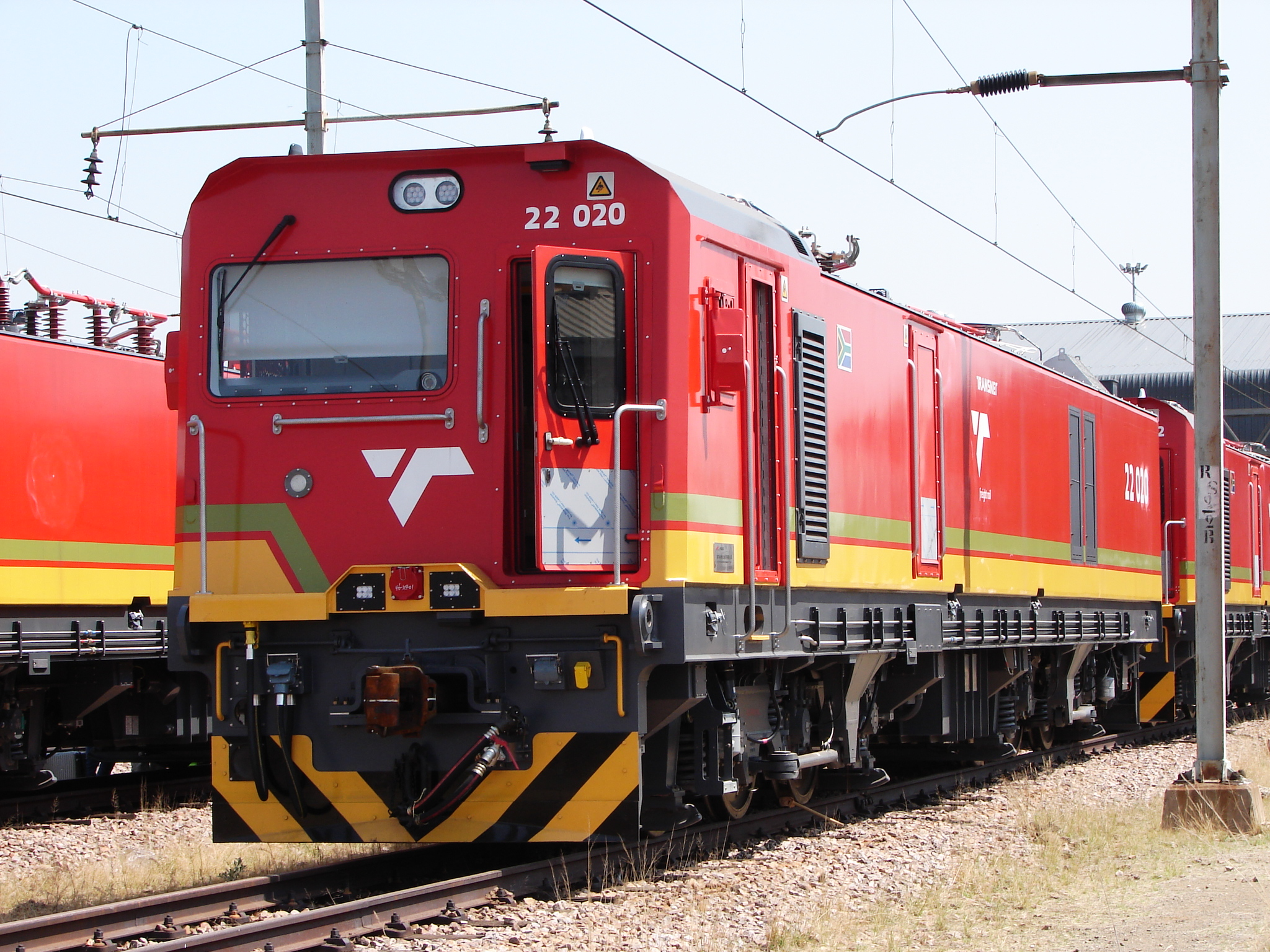
- No. 22-020 at Pyramid South on 22 September 2015
Type and origin
- Power type: Electric
- Designer: Zhuzhou Electric Locomotive Co
- Builder: Zhuzhou Electric Locomotive Co. Transnet Engineering
- Order number: TFRAC-HO-8608
- Model: ZELC 22E
- Build date: 2015-
- Total produced: 359
Specifications
- Configuration
  - AAR: C-C
  - UIC: Co'Co'
  - Commonwealth: Co-Co
- Gauge: 3 ft 6 in (1,067 mm) Cape gauge
- Length
  - Over couplers: 20,700 mm (67 ft 11 in)
  - Over beams: 20,192 mm (66 ft 3 in)
  - Over body: 19,652 mm (64 ft 5 3/4 in)
- Electric system/s: Dual 3 kV DC & 25 kV AC/50 Hz catenary
- Current pickup(s): Pantographs
- Traction motors: Six
- Loco brake: Electro-pneumatic, regenerative & rheostatic
- Train brakes: Air
- Couplers: AAR knuckle
Performance figures
- Power output: 4,600 kW (6,200 hp)
Career
- Operators: Transnet Freight Rail
- Class: 22E
- Number in class: 359
- Numbers: 22-001 to 22-359
- Delivered: 2015-
- First run: 2015

The Transnet Freight Rail Class 22E of 2015 is a South African electric locomotive.

On 10 April 2015, the first Class 22E dual voltage six-axle locomotive for Transnet Freight Rail was rolled out by the CSR Zhuzhou Electric Locomotive Company in China.

== Manufacturers ==
The first forty Class 22E dual voltage 3 kV DC and 25 kV AC Co-Co locomotives for Transnet Freight Rail were built in China by Zhuzhou Electric Locomotive Company, a subsidiary of the China South Locomotive and Rolling Stock Corporation (CSR). The roll-out ceremony of the first locomotive, no. 22-002, took place at the factory on 10 April 2015. The rest of the order for 359 locomotives are being built locally at the Koedoespoort shops of Transnet Engineering in Pretoria.

The acquisition of the Class 22E forms part of the largest-ever locomotive supply contract in South African history and the single-biggest investment initiative by a South African corporation. It consists of contracts for the construction of 1,064 locomotives by four global original equipment manufacturers:

- CSR Zhuzhou Electric Locomotive Company, for 359 Class 22E dual-voltage electric locomotives.
- Bombardier Transportation South Africa, for 240 Class 23E dual-voltage electric locomotives.
- General Electric South Africa Technologies (a unit of the U.S.-based GE Transportation), for 233 Class 44-000 diesel-electric locomotives.
- CNR Rolling Stock South Africa (Pty.) Ltd., for 232 Class 45-000 diesel-electric locomotives.

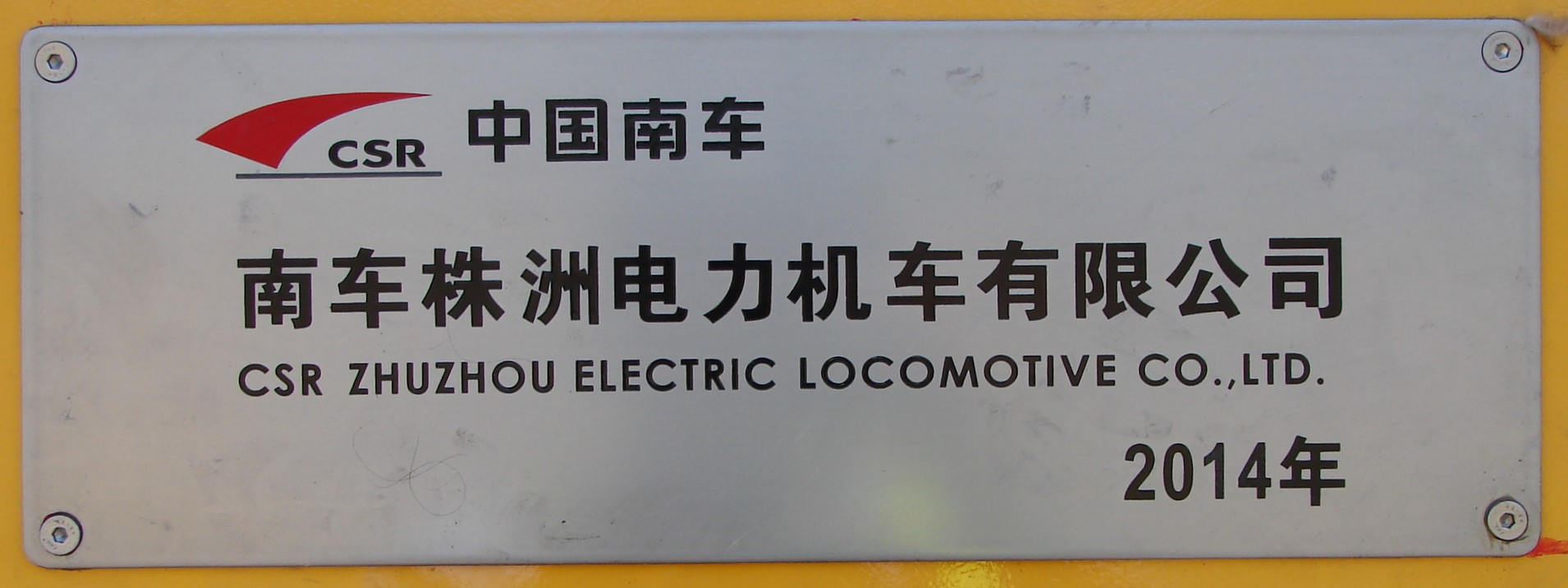

The builder's plates on the Chinese-built locomotives are inscribed with the year 2015, but for an unknown reason the plate on no. 22-041, the first of the South African-builts, is incorrectly inscribed "2014".

== The Class number ==
In the 1930s, during the steam era of the South African Railways, a heavier mainline version of the Class 21 2-10-4 steam locomotive, the Class 22 2-10-4, was proposed, but never built. The Class 22E is therefore the first locomotive in South Africa to receive this class number.

== Characteristics ==
The locomotive body is a welded monocoque design, constructed of steel plates and profiled members. The Class 22E locomotive is virtually identical in visual appearance to the earlier Class 20E and Class 21E locomotives, but longer, with a different wheel arrangement and a different interior layout.

It has a nominal rating of 4,600 kilowatts (6,200 horsepower). This is the second type of modern Co-Co design electric locomotive to join Transnet's fleet after the heavy-duty Class 15E, which is used on the Sishen-Saldanha (Orex) route. Both these locomotives are single cab types.

=== Layout ===
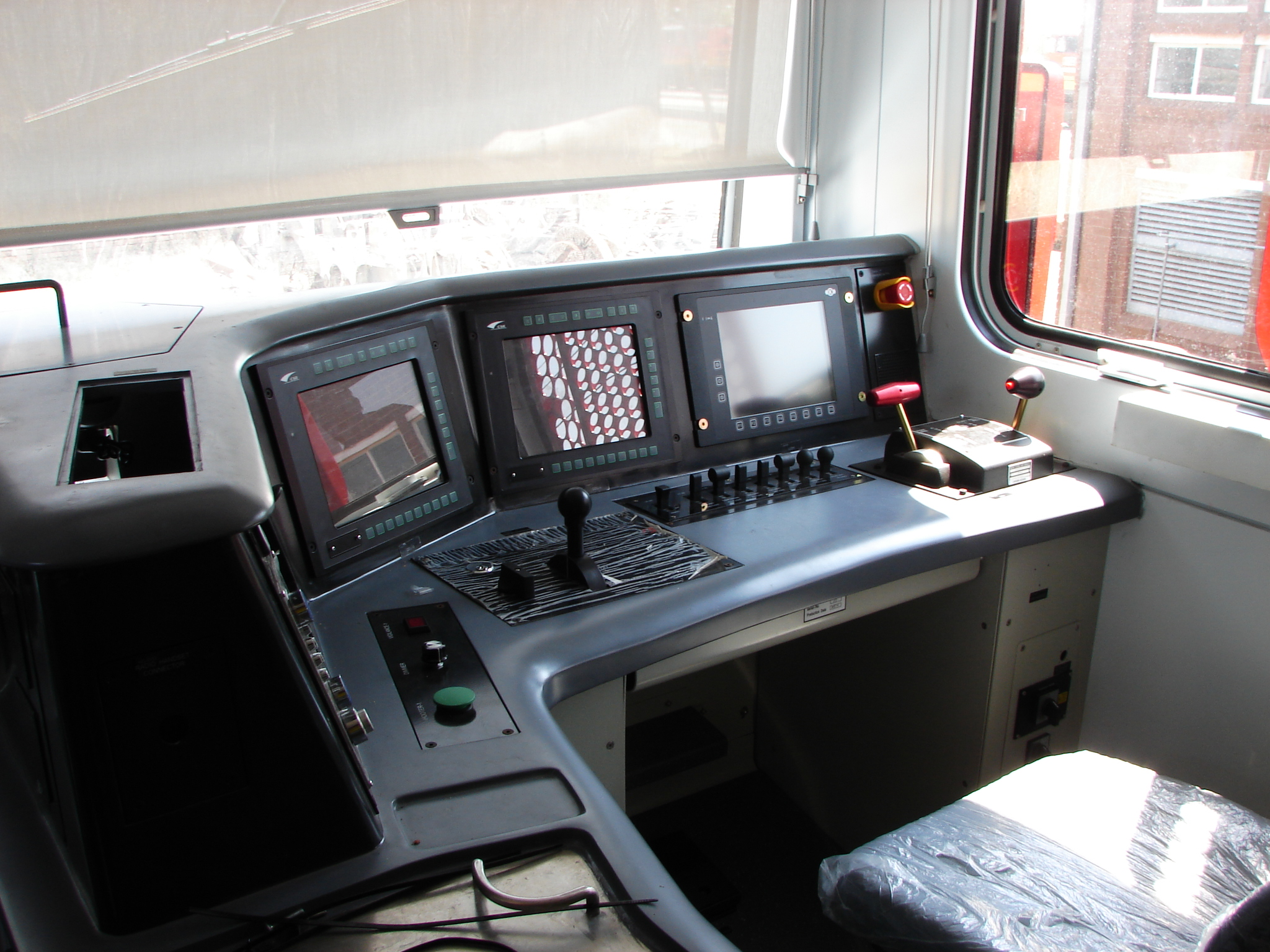
Driver's station of no. 22-013

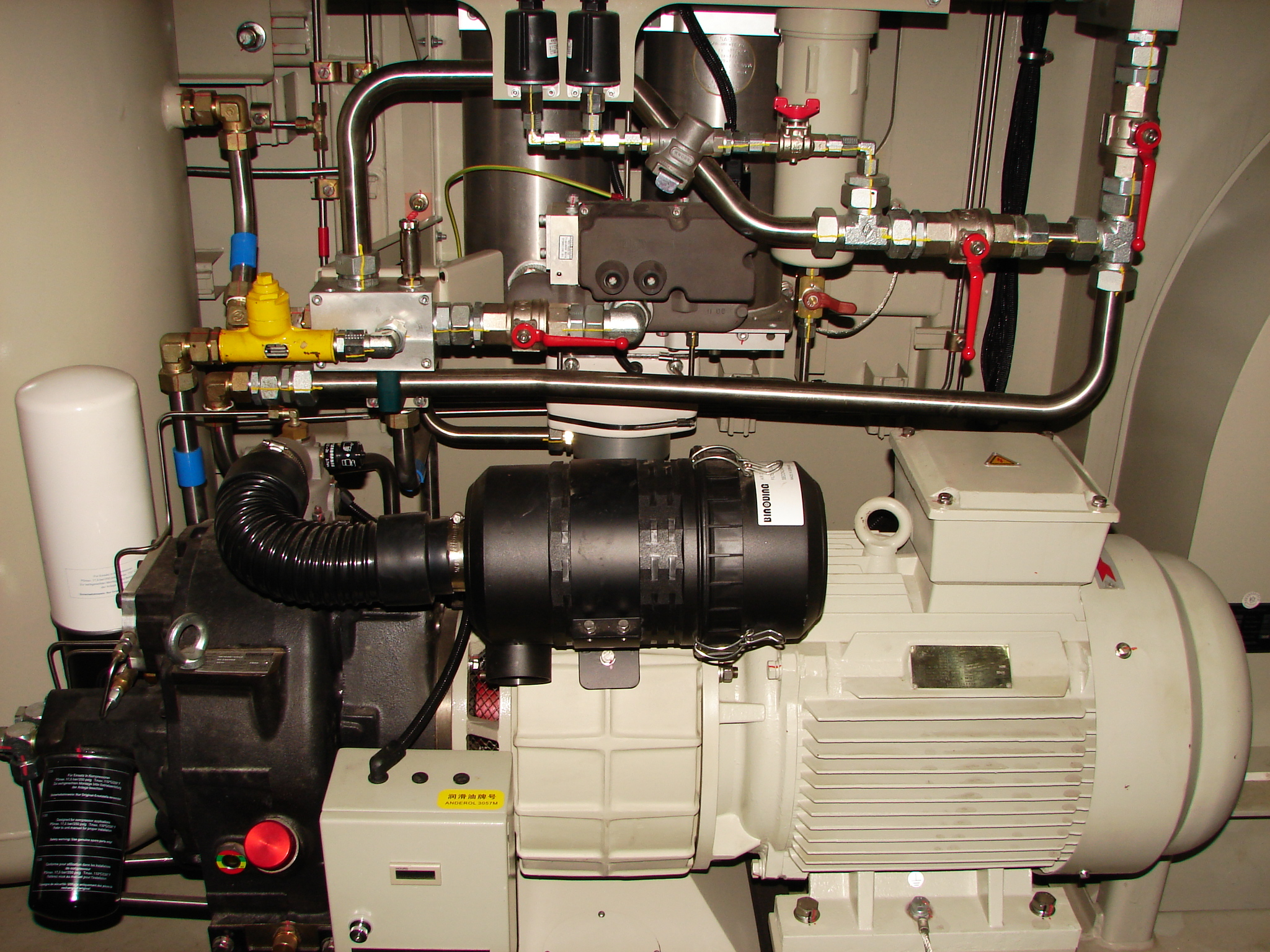
Compressor

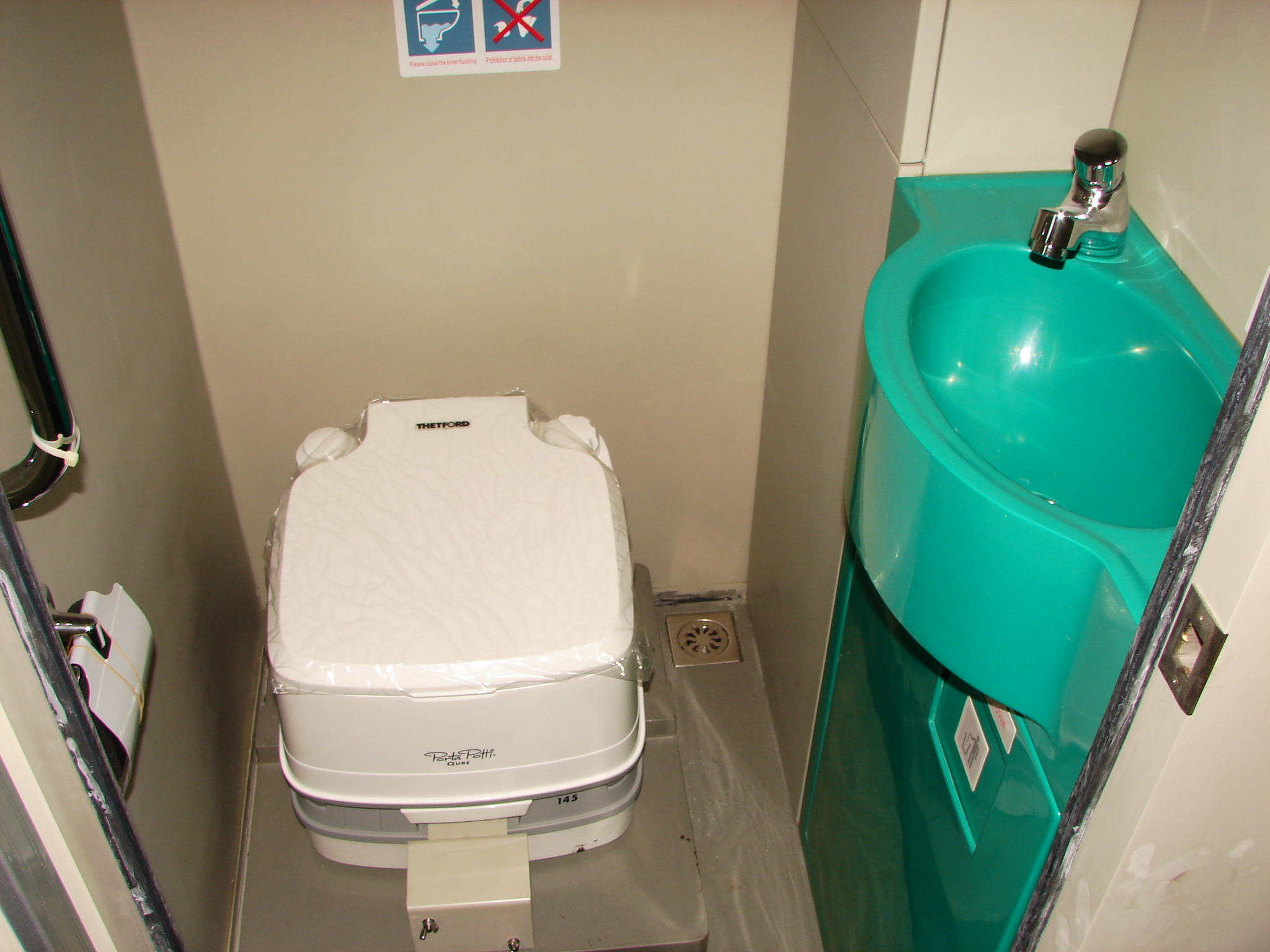
Toilet

The Class 22E has a single cab and a gangway along the centre of the locomotive, while the interior layout and placement of equipment is as follows, from the cab towards the rear:

Left side

- Air conditioner.
- Low voltage cubicle.
- Service entrance portal and door.
- Power converter cubicle 1.
- Cooling tower 1.
- Ventilation cubicle.
- Traction motor blower 2.
- Integrated cubicle.
- Air reservoir 2.
- Braking resistor 1.
- Braking cubicle.

Right side

- Signal cubicle (19" rack).
- Battery charger.
- Traction motor blower 1.
- Auxiliary transformer type TBQ56-5640/25.
- Cooling tower 2.
- Power converter cubicle 2.
- High voltage cubicle.
- Air reservoir 1.
- Air drier and main compressor.
- Braking resistor 2.
- Toilet, with a porta-potty and hand washbasin.

=== Dual voltage ===
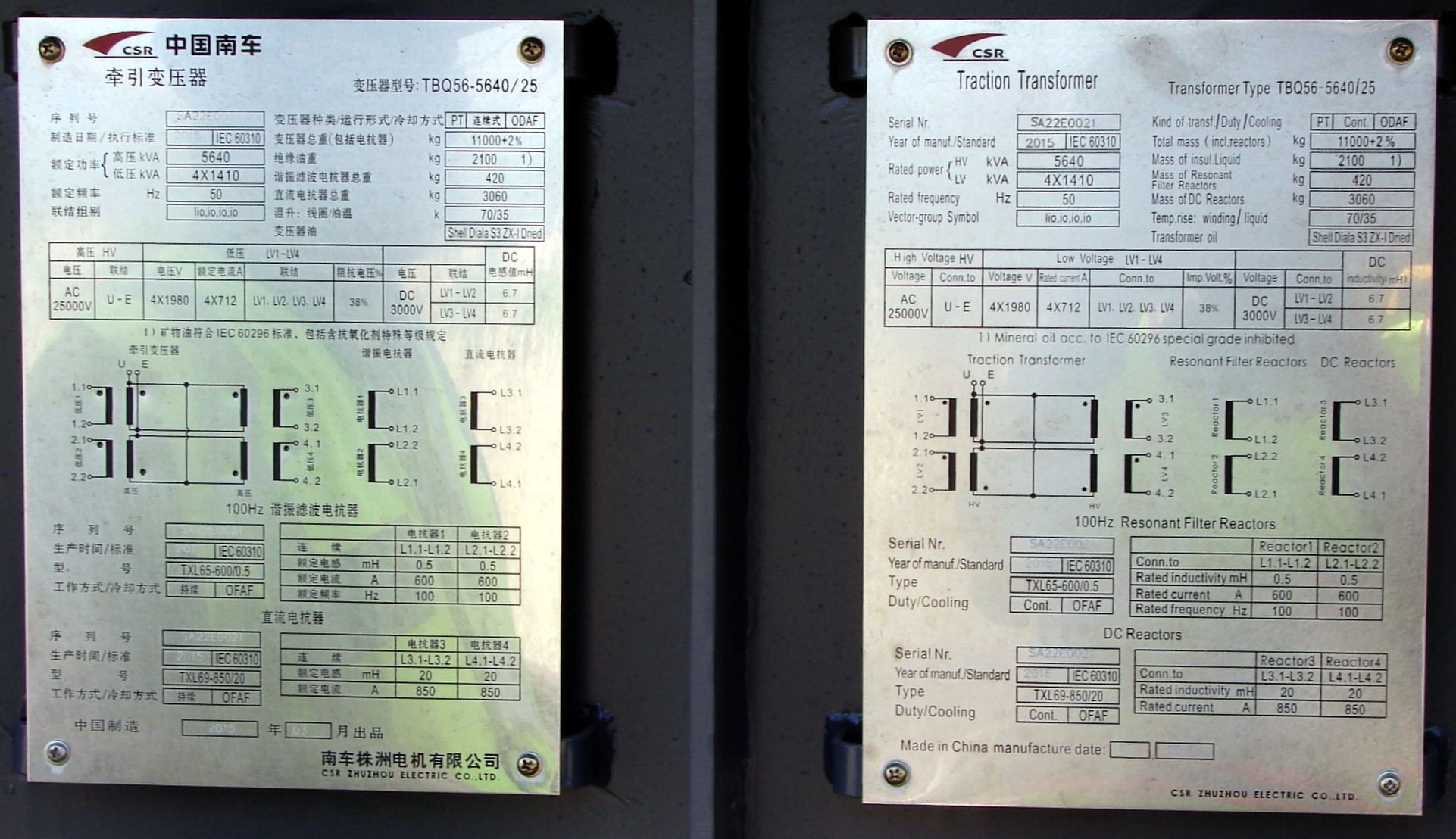
Transformer specifications: 22-013

As on the dual voltage Classes 19E, 20E and 21E, the main electric circuit is automatically selected in either AC or DC mode based on the voltage of the overhead contact wire feeding the locomotive. To facilitate automatic trouble-free transition on the run, the locomotive is equipped with onboard voltage detectors, while the overhead wire is equipped with two wooden isolators and a 3 metres (10 feet) length of neutral wire to separate the AC and DC feeds. The neutral section is connected to the rails which serve as the return conductor on electrified lines.

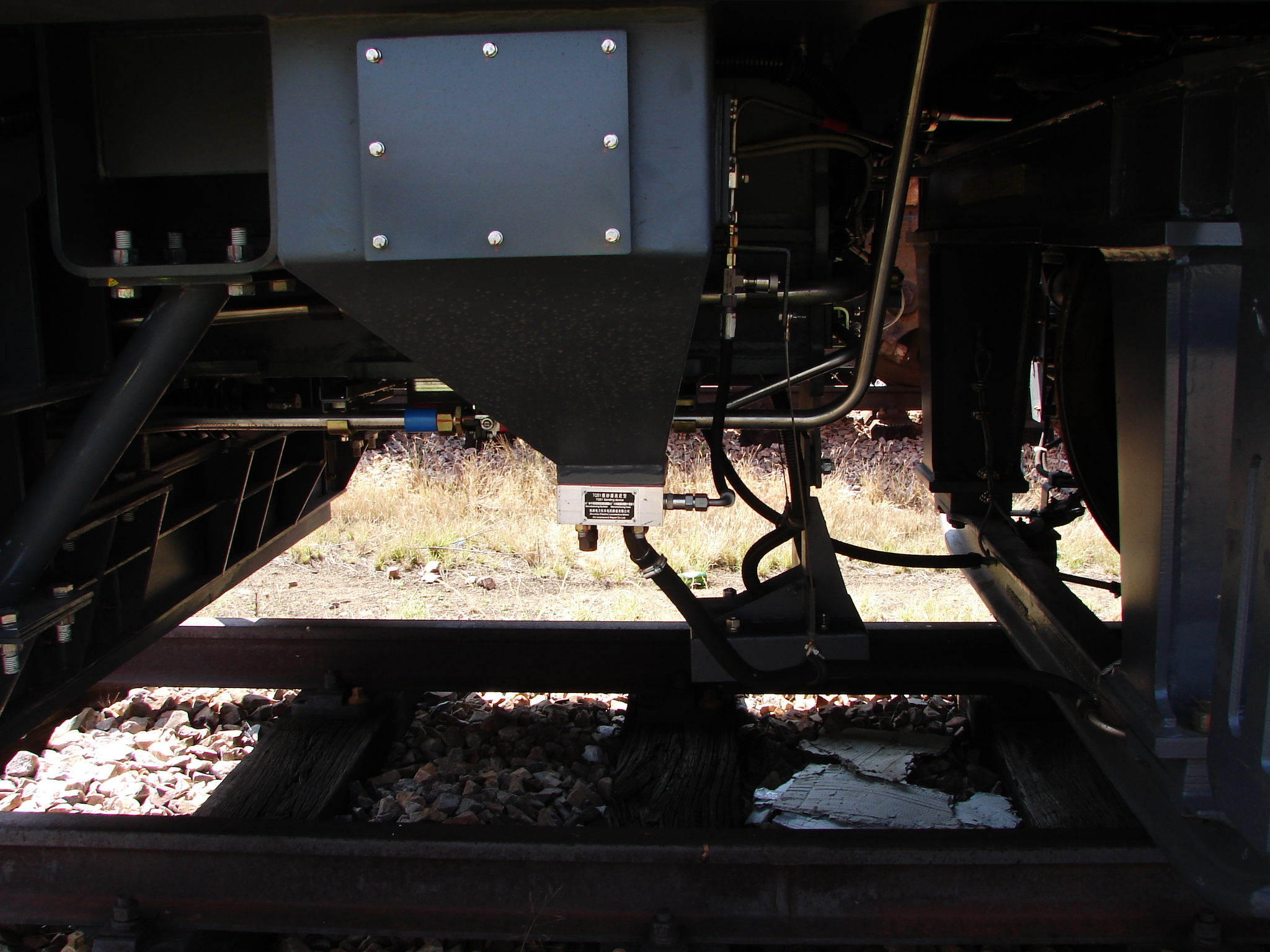
Track magnet sensor

The transition process requires that the locomotive should automatically be switched off before it reaches the isolators and the unpowered overhead wire section, and automatically be restarted after exiting from under the unpowered wire. This is done by a pair of track magnets, one on either side of the neutral overhead wire and spaced 45 metres (148 feet) apart. The two magnets are mounted with their polarities reversed in relation to each other and they activate a magnetic relay located behind the cowcatcher of the locomotive to do the switching off and restarting.

=== Pantographs ===
Transnet Freight Rail insisted that the locomotive must be designed in such a way that the pantograph contact shoe centres are directly above the bogie pivot centres, as was done on the Class 7E and Class 7E2, Series 1 and Series 2, and again on the Classes 20E and 21E. The reason is to reduce the possibility of pantograph hookups on catenary in sharp curves, such as in turnouts, as a result of sideways movement of the pantograph in relation to the overhead wire.

== Illustration ==
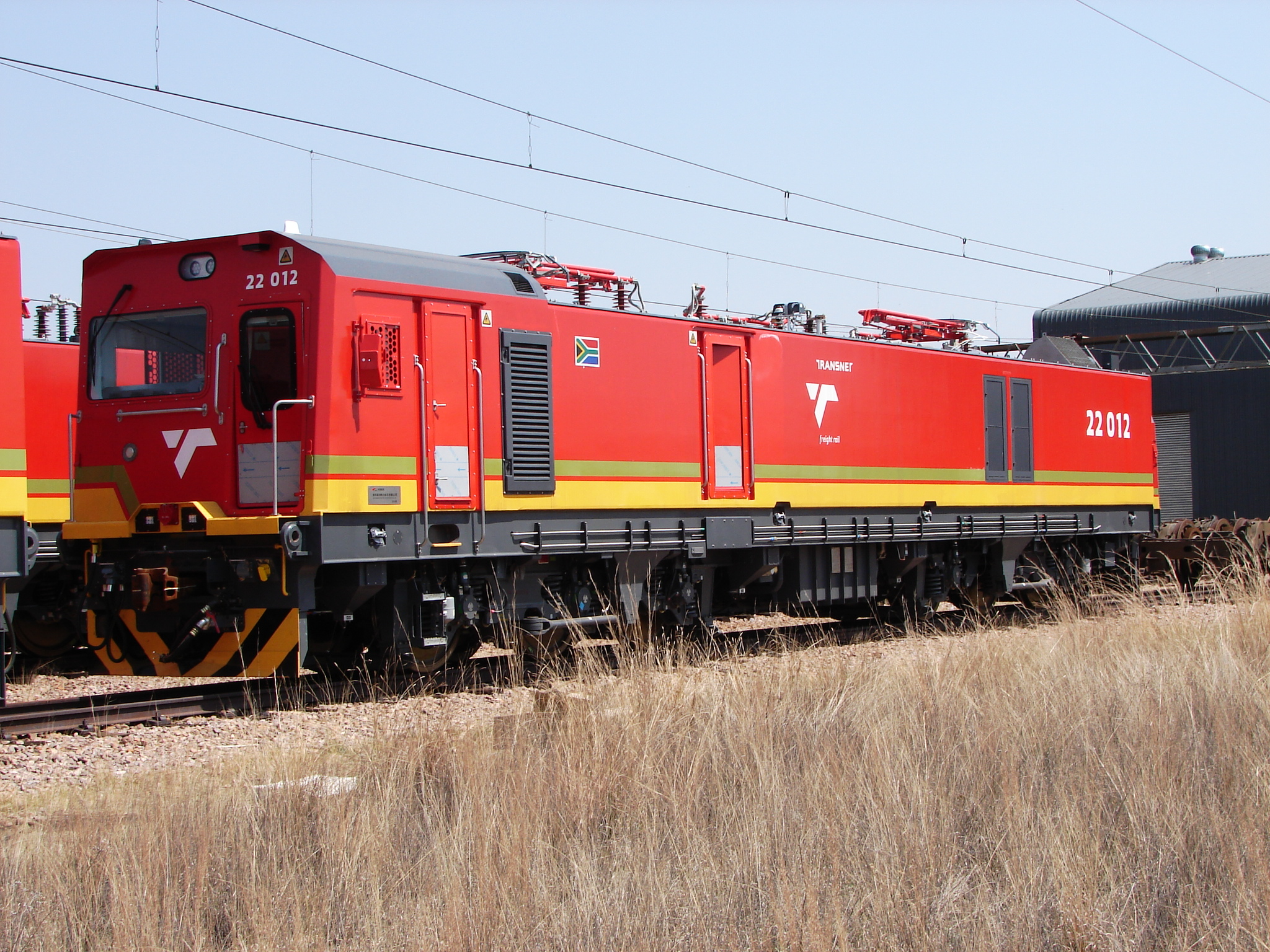
No. 22-012 at Pyramid South on 22 September 2015

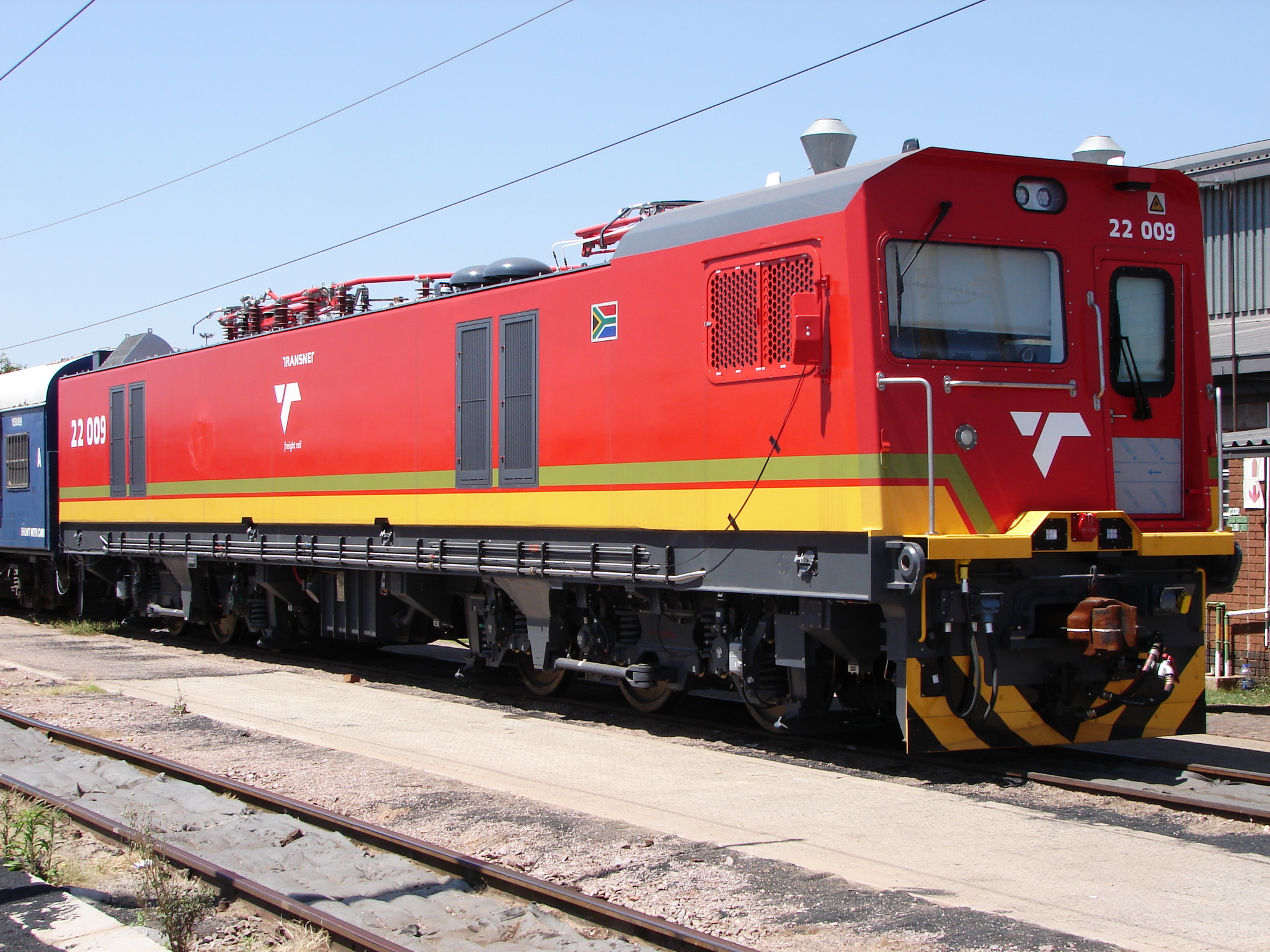
No. 22-009 at Pyramid South on 27 September 2015

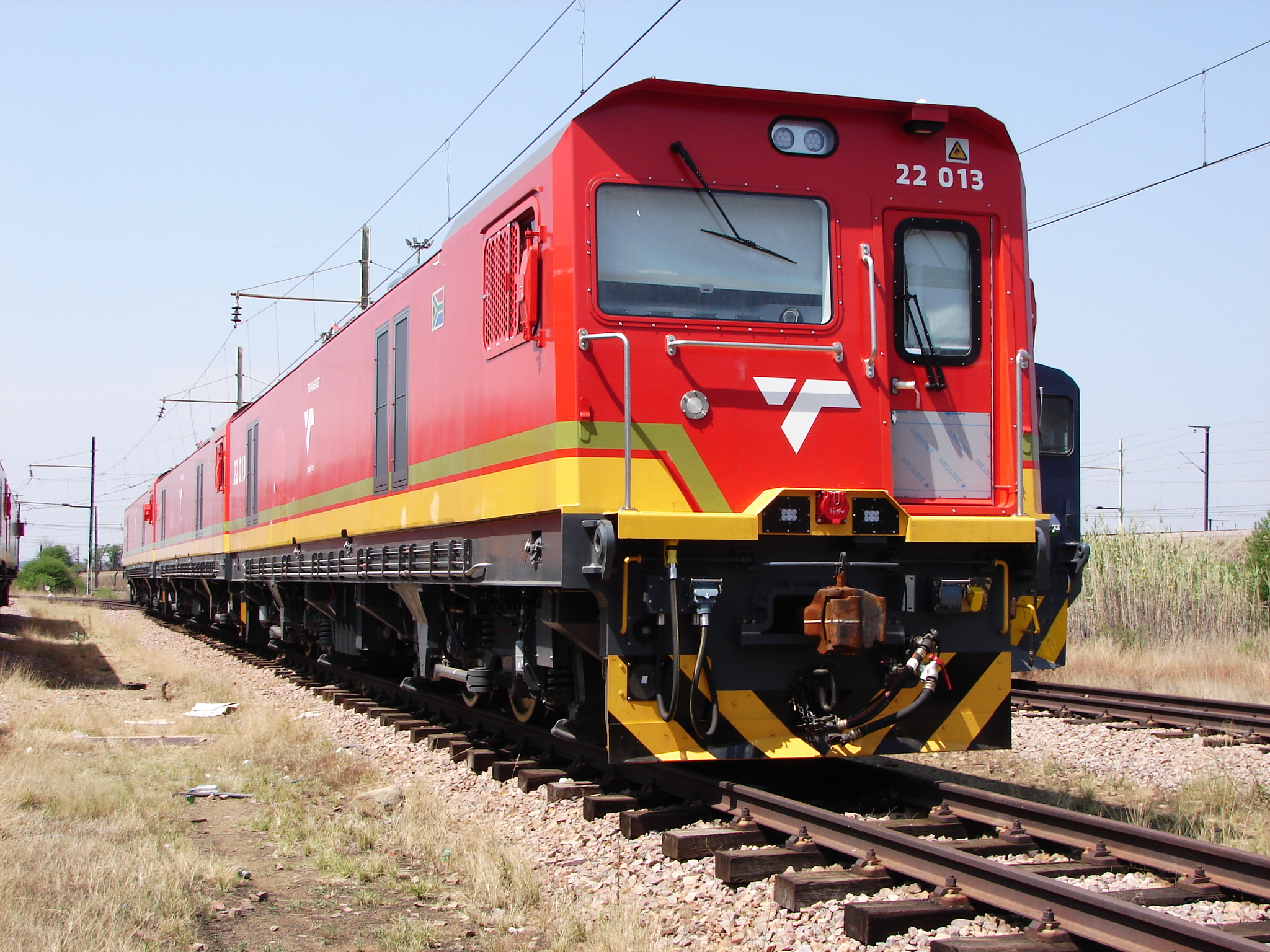
No. 22-013 at Pyramid South on 22 September 2015

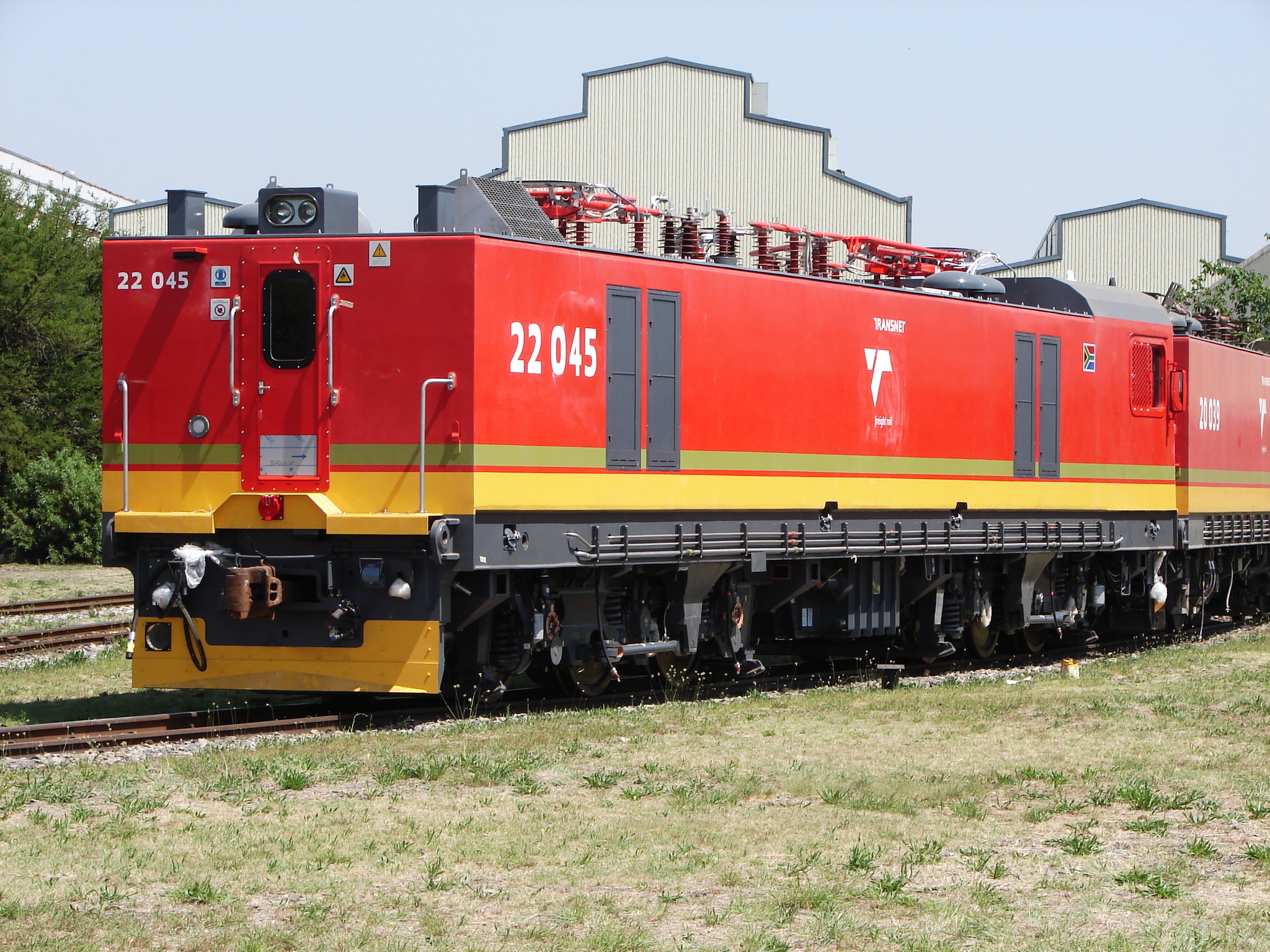
No. 22-045 at Koedoespoort, Pretoria on 29 September 2015
