= South African Class 44-000 =

South African diesel-electric locomotive

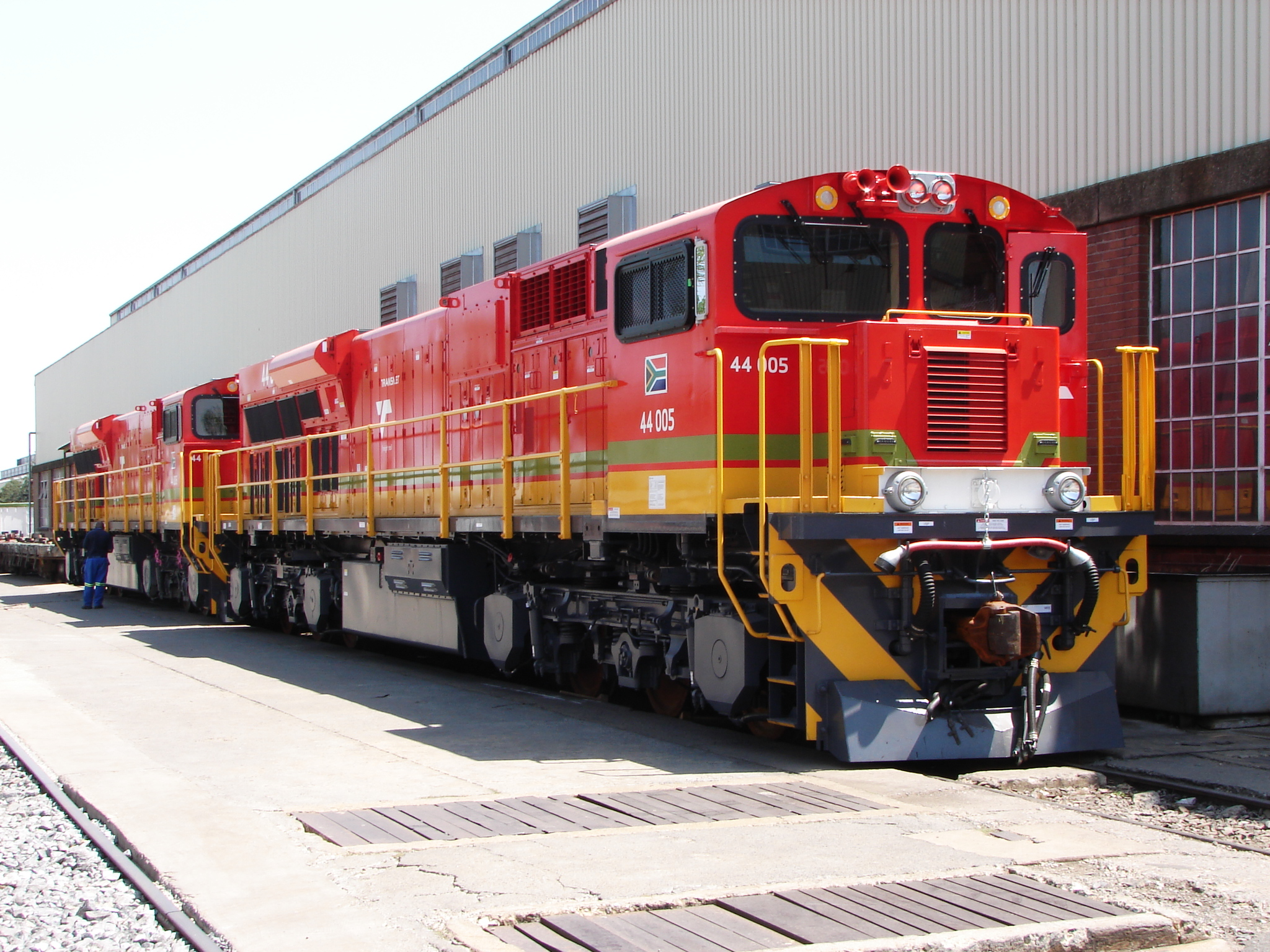
- 44-005 at Koedoespoort in September 2015
Type and origin
- Power type: Diesel-electric
- Designer: General Electric
- Builder: General Electric; Transnet Engineering
- Model: GE ES40ACi
- Build date: 2015-
- Total produced: 233
Specifications
- Configuration
  - AAR: C-C
  - UIC: Co'Co'
  - Commonwealth: Co-Co
- Gauge: 3 ft 6 in (1,067 mm) Cape gauge
- Wheel diameter: 1,040 mm (40.9 in)
- Axle load: 22,000 kg (49,000 lb)
- Loco weight: 132,000 kg (291,000 lb)
- Fuel type: Diesel
- Prime mover: GEVO-12
- Engine type: 4-stroke diesel
- Aspiration: Electronic fuel-injection system
- Displacement: Bore 250 mm (9.8 in); Stroke 320 mm (12.6 in)
- Traction motors: Six 445 kW (597 hp) GE 3-phase AC induction
- Loco brake: Air & Dynamic
- Couplers: AAR knuckle
Performance figures
- Power output: 4,200 hp (3,100 kW)
Career
- Operators: Transnet Freight Rail
- Class: Class 44-000
- Number in class: 233
- Numbers: 44-001 to 44-233
- Locale: South Africa
- Delivered: 2015-
- First run: 2015

The Transnet Freight Rail Class 44-000 of 2015 is a South African diesel-electric locomotive operated by Transnet Freight Rail.

== History ==
In 2014, Transnet Freight Rail ordered 233 GE ES40ACis from General Electric.

The first six were built in the United States by General Electric in Erie, Pennsylvania, in April and July 2015. In October 2015 the first of 227 locally-built locomotives was nearing completion at the Koedoespoort shops in Pretoria, while the first two of the six imported locomotives were undergoing testing on the line between Pyramid South and Warmbad.

The core components, such as the GEVO-12 prime movers, were manufactured in the United States, with locomotive construction and final assembly taking place at Koedoespoort. The contract required a minimum local content for rolling stock of 55%.
