= South African Class 4E =

Type of electric locomotive

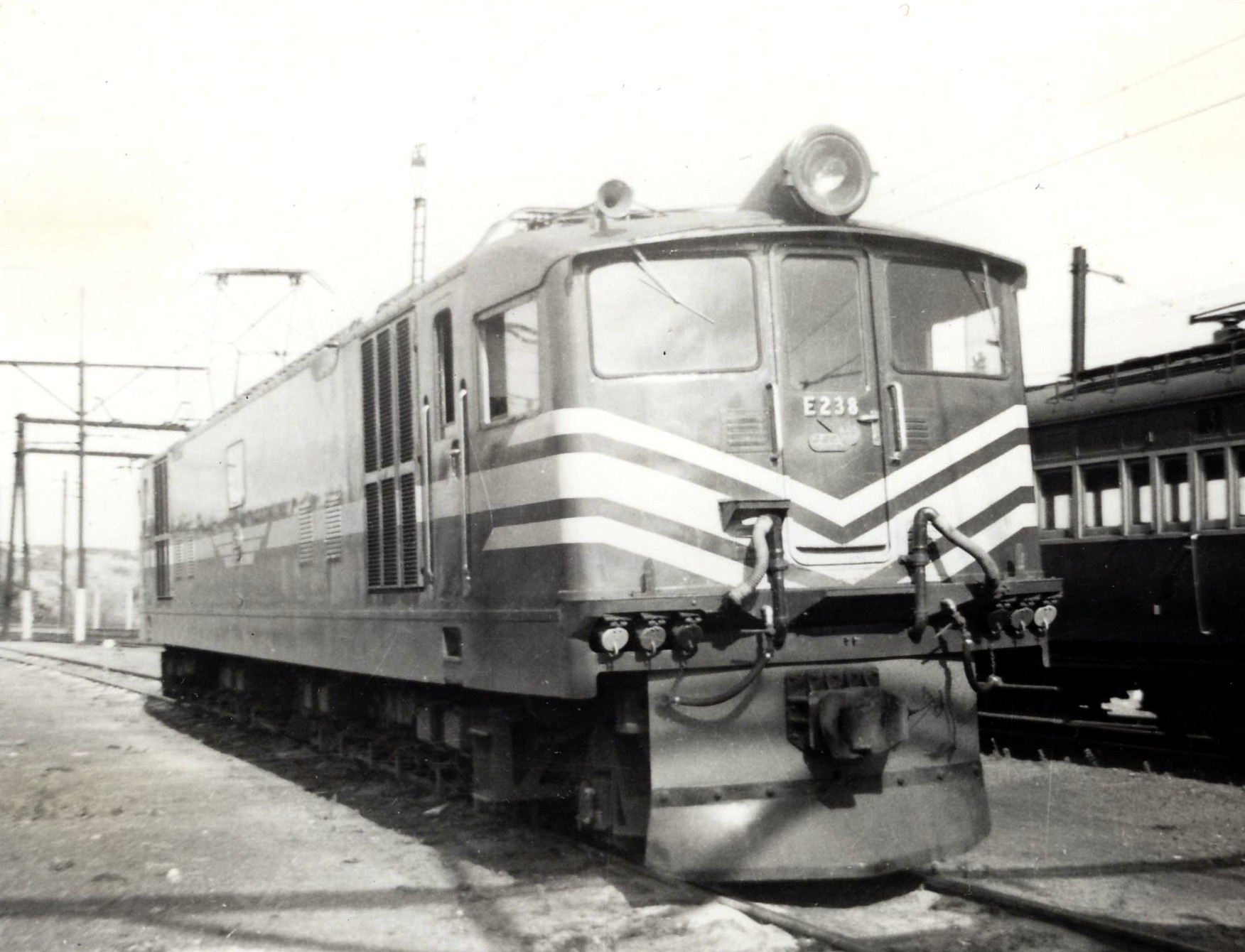
- E238 at the Salt River Depot, Cape Town, 7 January 1966
Type and origin
- Power type: Electric
- Designer: General Electric Company
- Builder: North British Locomotive Company
- Serial number: 26859-26898
- Model: GEC 4E
- Build date: 1952-1953
- Total produced: 40
Specifications
- Configuration
  - AAR: 1-C+C-1
  - UIC: (1′Co)+(Co1′)
  - Commonwealth: 1Co+Co1
- Gauge: 3 ft 6 in (1,067 mm) Cape gauge
- Leading dia.: 762 mm (30 in)
- Wheel diameter: 1,295 mm (50.98 in)
- Wheelbase: 18,390 mm (60 ft 4 in)
  - Axle spacing (Asymmetrical): 1-2: 2,337 mm (7 ft 8 in); 2-3: 2,286 mm (7 ft 6 in)
  - Bogie: 6,833 mm (22 ft 5 in)
- Pivot centres: 10,795 mm (35 ft 5 in)
- Panto shoes: 14,122 mm (46 ft 4 in)
- Length
  - Over couplers: 21,844 mm (71 ft 8 in)
- Height
  - Pantograph: 4,140 mm (13 ft 7 in)
  - Body height: 3,924 mm (12 ft 10 1/2 in)
- Axle load: 21,845 kg (48,160 lb)
  - Leading: 13,209 kg (29,121 lb)
- Adhesive weight: 131,070 kg (288,960 lb)
- Loco weight: 157,488 kg (347,202 lb)
- Electric system/s: 3 kV DC catenary
- Current pickup(s): Pantographs
- Traction motors: Six GEC WT580
  - Rating 1 hour: 377 kW (506 hp)
  - Continuous: 313 kW (420 hp)
- Gear ratio: 21:75
- Loco brake: Regenerative
- Train brakes: Air & Vacuum
- Couplers: AAR knuckle
Performance figures
- Maximum speed: 97 km/h (60 mph)
- Power output
  - 1 hour: 2,262 kW (3,033 hp)
  - Continuous: 1,878 kW (2,518 hp)
- Tractive effort
  - Starting: 322 kN (72,000 lbf)
  - 1 hour: 185 kN (42,000 lbf)
  - Continuous: 141 kN (32,000 lbf)
Career
- Operators: South African Railways
- Class: Class 4E
- Number in class: 40
- Numbers: E219-E258
- Nicknames: Groen Mamba (Green Mamba); Groot Mamba (Large Mamba)
- Delivered: 1952-1954
- First run: 1952

The South African Railways Class 4E of 1952 was an electric locomotive.

Between 1952 and 1954, the South African Railways placed forty Class 4E electric locomotives with a 1Co+Co1 wheel arrangement in temporary service on the Natal mainline and from 1954 on the mainline from Cape Town across the Hex River rail pass to Touws River in the Karoo.

== Manufacturer ==
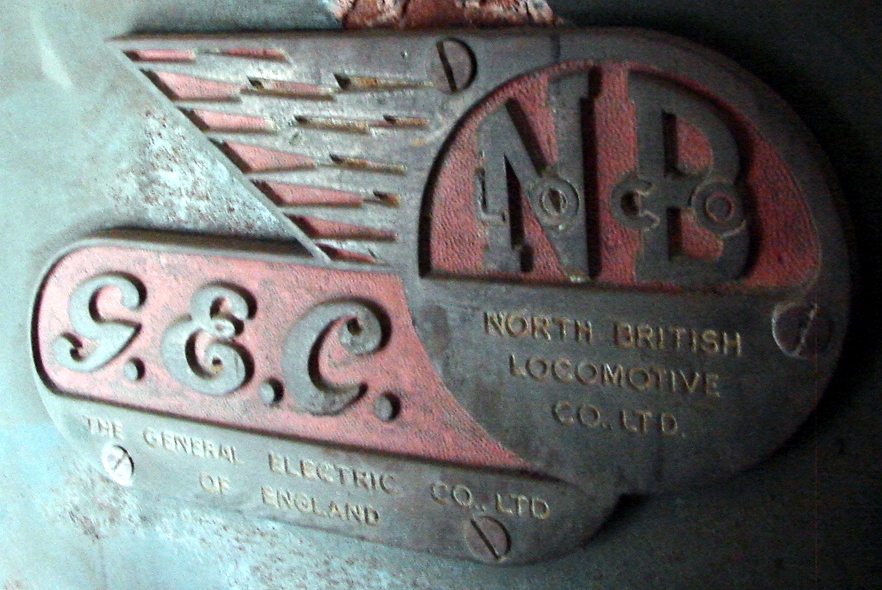
GEC and NBL logos on the end doors

The 3 kV DC Class 4E electric locomotive was designed for the South African Railways (SAR) by the General Electric Company (GEC) and was built by the North British Locomotive Company (NBL) in 1952 and 1953. They were delivered between 1952 and 1954 and were numbered in the range from E219 to E258. The Class 4E was amongst the most powerful electric locomotives in the world at that time.

== Orientation ==
These dual cab locomotives had two large grilles on one side and a corridor linking the cabs on the opposite side. When observing the locomotive from the side with the grilles, the number 1 end would be to the right. As on the earlier Class 3E, the unit had side doors on both sides behind each cab. It had roof access ladders on the smooth left side only, one aft of each side door. Like the Classes 1E, 2E and 3E, the Class 4E had bogie-mounted pilots and draft gear and an articulated inter-bogie linkage, therefore no train forces were transmitted to the locomotive body.

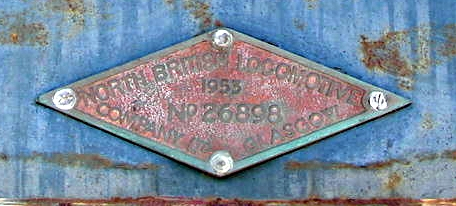
NBL works plate, no. E258

As delivered, the Class 4E units did not have the "eyebrow" sunshades above the front windscreens. These were later fitted in Cape Town to prevent pantograph grease from befouling the windscreens.

The Class 4E had a 1Co+Co1 wheel arrangement, with an additional bissel truck at the outer end of each of the two three-axle powered bogies. The Classes 32-000 and 32-200 diesel-electric locomotive types also used this wheel arrangement, but the Class 4E was unique amongst South African electric locomotives in this respect.

== Service ==
The Class 4E was specifically acquired for use on the mainline from Cape Town across the Hex River rail pass to Touws River, from where Class 23 and later Class 25 and Class 25NC steam locomotives would take over across the stretch of unelectrified mainline to De Aar and from there to either Kimberley or Bloemfontein.

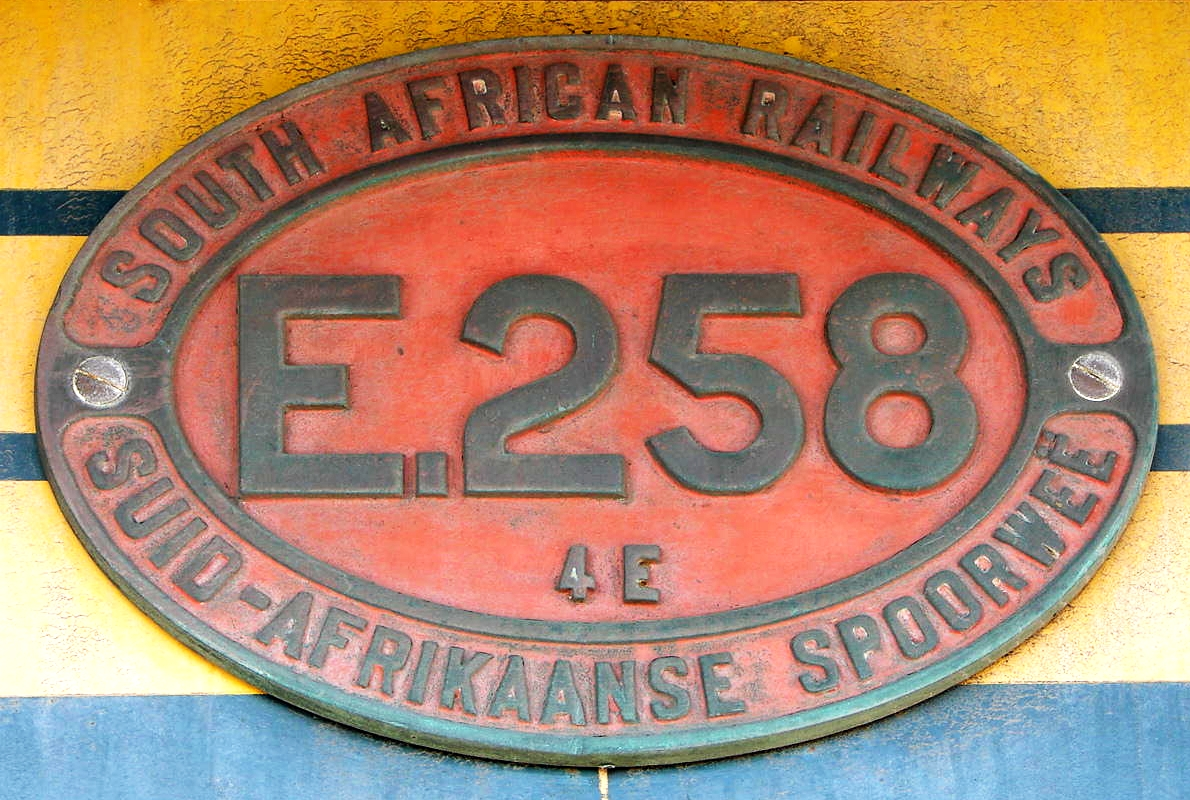

Since the completion of Eskom's high-tension power feeds in the Cape was late, the first locomotives to be delivered in 1952 were placed in service on the Natal mainline while awaiting electrification from Wellington via Worcester to Touws River. They were to be transferred to the Cape as soon as the wires were energised, but they eventually had to be withdrawn from Natal earlier because the severe curvature of the Natal mainline caused their frames to crack.

Class leader no. E219 was the first unit to be relocated to Cape Town in March 1953, where it initially ran on the 1.5 kV DC power which was still being used for Cape Town's suburban trains until the upgrading of the Cape Town lines to 3 kV DC was completed in November 1954. The 3 kV DC electrification from Worcester had reached Touws river in April 1954. Until then, the locomotive's load capacity and mobility were restricted. In Cape service, some teething troubles were experienced with their bogies, particularly when going faster than 45 miles per hour (72 kilometres per hour). The problem was hunting which became increasingly severe at higher speed and the units were therefore employed mainly on goods traffic until 1956, by which time their bogie faults had been ironed out.

The Class 4E was rated at double the load of a Class 15F without banker over the Hex River rail pass, 770 tons against 360 tons for the same train length. With assistance from a banker between De Doorns and Matroosberg, a Class 15F and Class 14CRM combination could almost match the Class 4E, but between Cape Town and De Doorns an unaided Class 4E could haul half as much again as a Class 15F, 1264 tons as against 820 tons.

Two Class 4E units briefly served on the Western Transvaal System while being relocated from Natal via Transvaal to the Cape. That system was granted permission to use no. E247 and one other for between four and six weeks, working from the Electric Running Shed at Braamfontein, before the locomotives were forwarded to Cape Town.

From 1954 onwards, the Class 4E took over working of the Blue Train with increasing regularity, long before the last Class 15Fs were drafted away to the Cape Midland System in September 1957.

== Hex River tunnels scheme ==
The Class 4E purchase was part of a scheme to eliminate the 1 in 40 (2.5%) gradients and severe curvature of the Hex River rail pass, which would also entail the construction of a series of four tunnels through the Hex River Mountains. The tunnel system would have enabled a single Class 4E locomotive to haul 1,000 ton trains up the resulting 1 in 66 (1 1/2%) gradients.

The Hex River tunnels scheme (Hexton) was initially started in 1945, but was deferred indefinitely in 1950 as a result of financial constraints. The tunnel scheme was briefly resuscitated in 1965 but was deferred once again in 1966. Work was eventually resumed in 1974 and included the remodelling of the lower section of the deviation between De Doorns and Osplaas as well as the construction of the short twin tunnels. This was completed in 1976, at which point financial constraints resulted in yet another postponement. Authority to proceed was only given once again in late 1979.

When the project was resumed, the eastern portal of the longest tunnel was relocated a short distance to the southeast of the original site, while the location of the western portal remained as originally planned. The tunnel system was opened on 27 November 1989, by which time the Class 4Es were already withdrawn from service after having spent their entire careers double-heading trains across the Hex River rail pass.

== Liveries ==
The Class 4E was delivered in an all-over green livery with red cowcatchers. The colour and the almost 22 metres (72 feet) length of the locomotive quickly earned it the nickname Groen Mamba (Green Mamba). This changed to Groot Mamba (Large Mamba) when the much shorter Class 5E began to work in the Cape and was nicknamed Klein Mamba (Little Mamba) by the Cape Western System's enginemen.

Soon after they entered service, Hex River Valley farmers complained that the bottle green livery made the locomotives difficult to see when they were approaching through the vineyards. In 1954, yellow lines were added all around the locomotive to improve its visibility, with various line patterns being used before eventually settling on the V-shaped whiskers on the ends which extended onto the sides, and multiple lines around the number plates on the sides. The attractive whiskers livery was adopted for all the electric locomotive classes of the SAR.

Beginning in 1960, a Gulf Red and yellow whiskers livery gradually replaced the green and yellow.

== Preservation ==
As of 2015, no. E258 has been staged at Bloemfontein Locomotive Depot where a Locomotive Museum is being created to restore it and some other historically significant units. Class leader no. E219 survives at Krugersdorp's Millsite Locomotive Depot.

== Works numbers ==
The NBL works numbers of the Class 4E are listed in the table.

Class 4E
Loco no.	Works no.
E219	26859
E220	26860
E221	26861
E222	26862
E223	26863
E224	26864
E225	26865
E226	26866
E227	26867
E228	26868
E229	26869
E230	26870
E231	26871
E232	26872
E233	26873
E234	26874
E235	26875
E236	26876
E237	26877
E238	26878
E239	26879
E240	26880
E241	26881
E242	26882
E243	26883
E244	26884
E245	26885
E246	26886
E247	26887
E248	26888
E249	26889
E250	26890
E251	26891
E252	26892
E253	26893
E254	26894
E255	26895
E256	26896
E257	26897
E258	26898

== Illustration ==
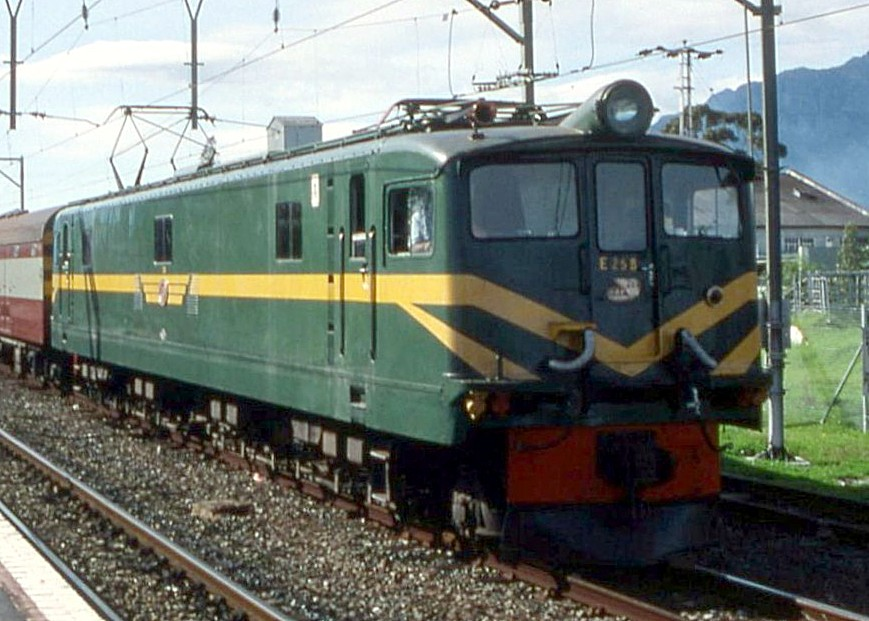
Left side of no. E258 with its no. 2 end leading, Vlottenburg station, 24 May 1993

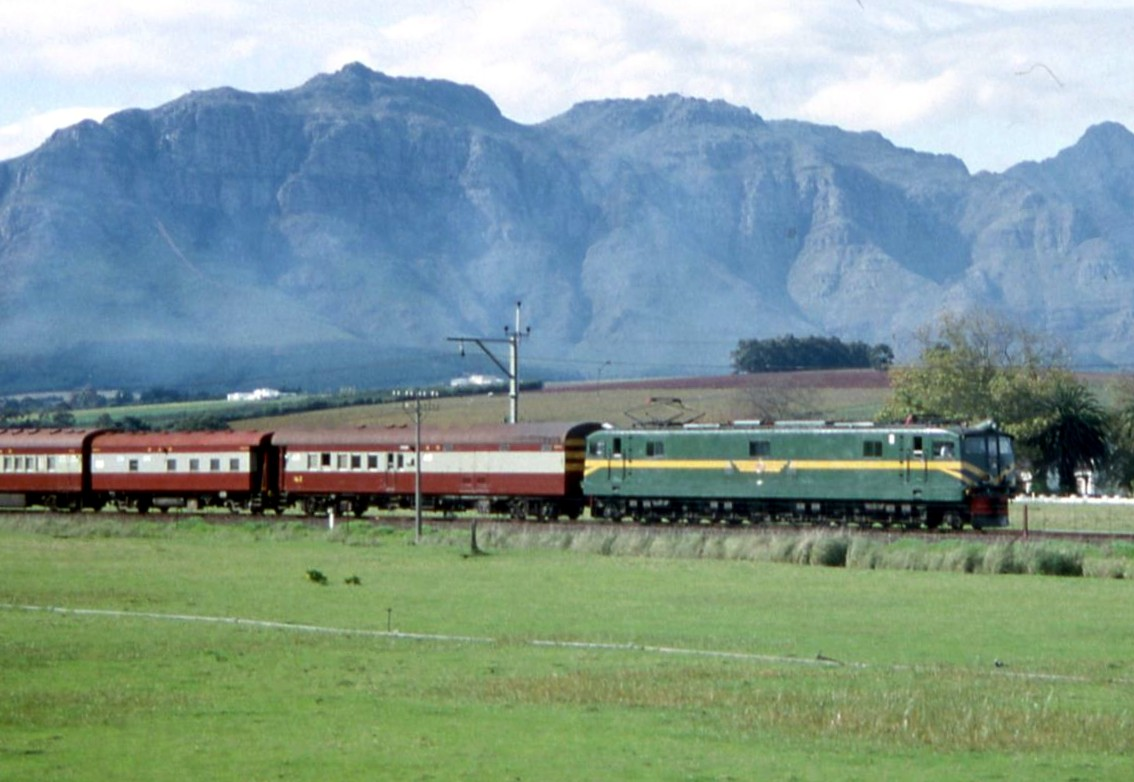
No. E258 showing the length which earned it the Green Mamba nickname, 24 May 1993

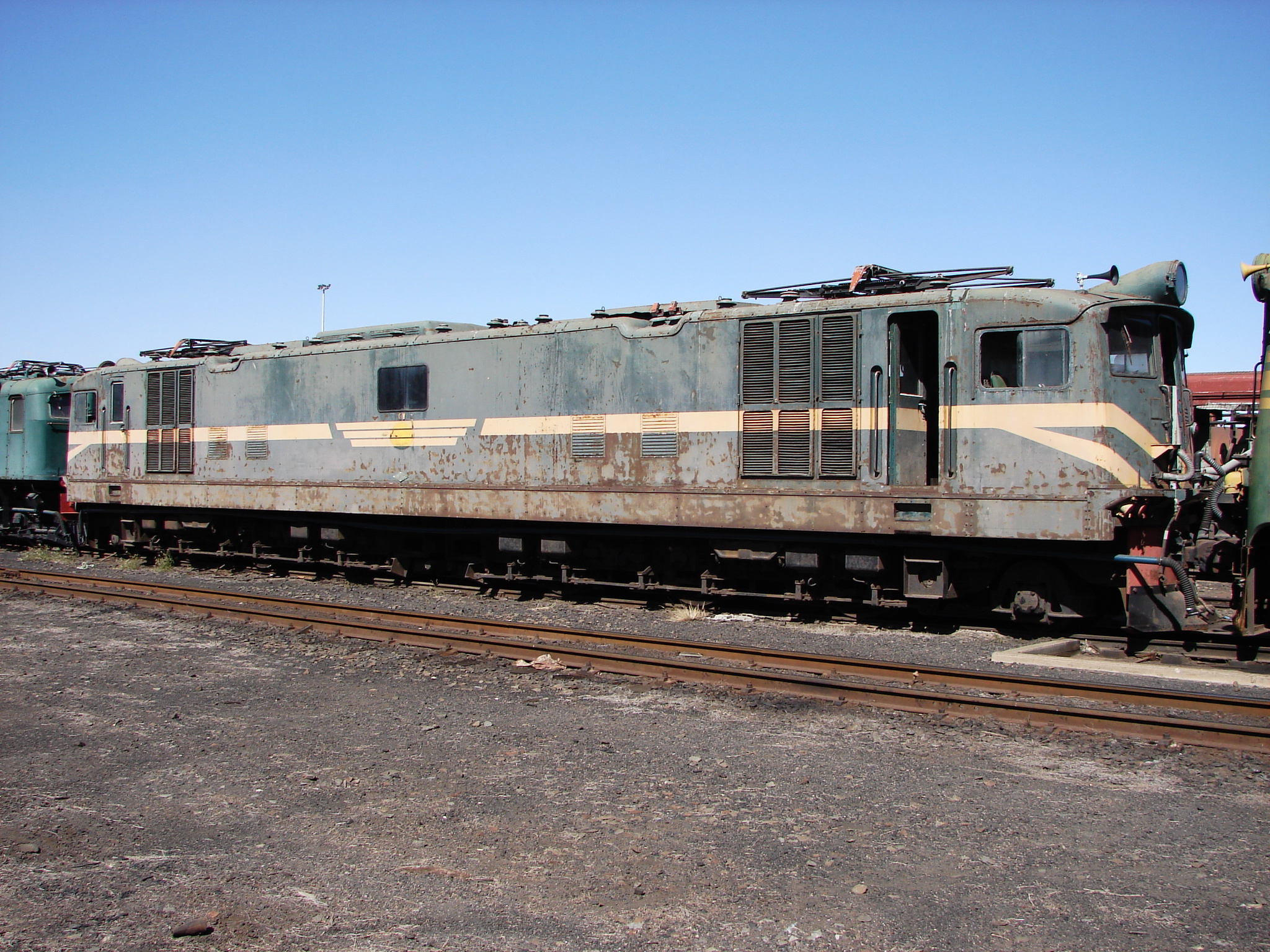
Right side of no. E258 with its no. 1 end at right, Bloemfontein, 18 September 2015

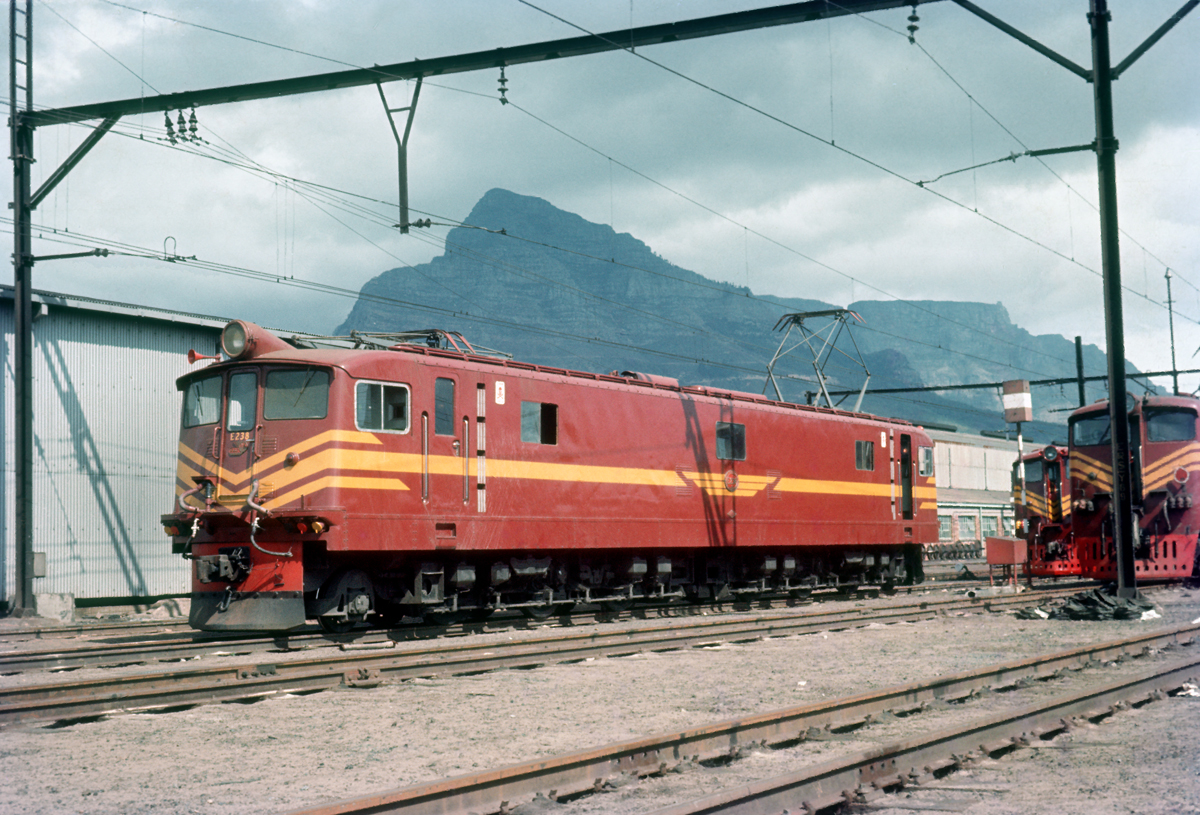
No. E238 in Gulf Red and yellow whiskers livery at Salt River Depot in Cape Town, 11 April 1970
