= South African Class 32-000 =

South African locomotive model

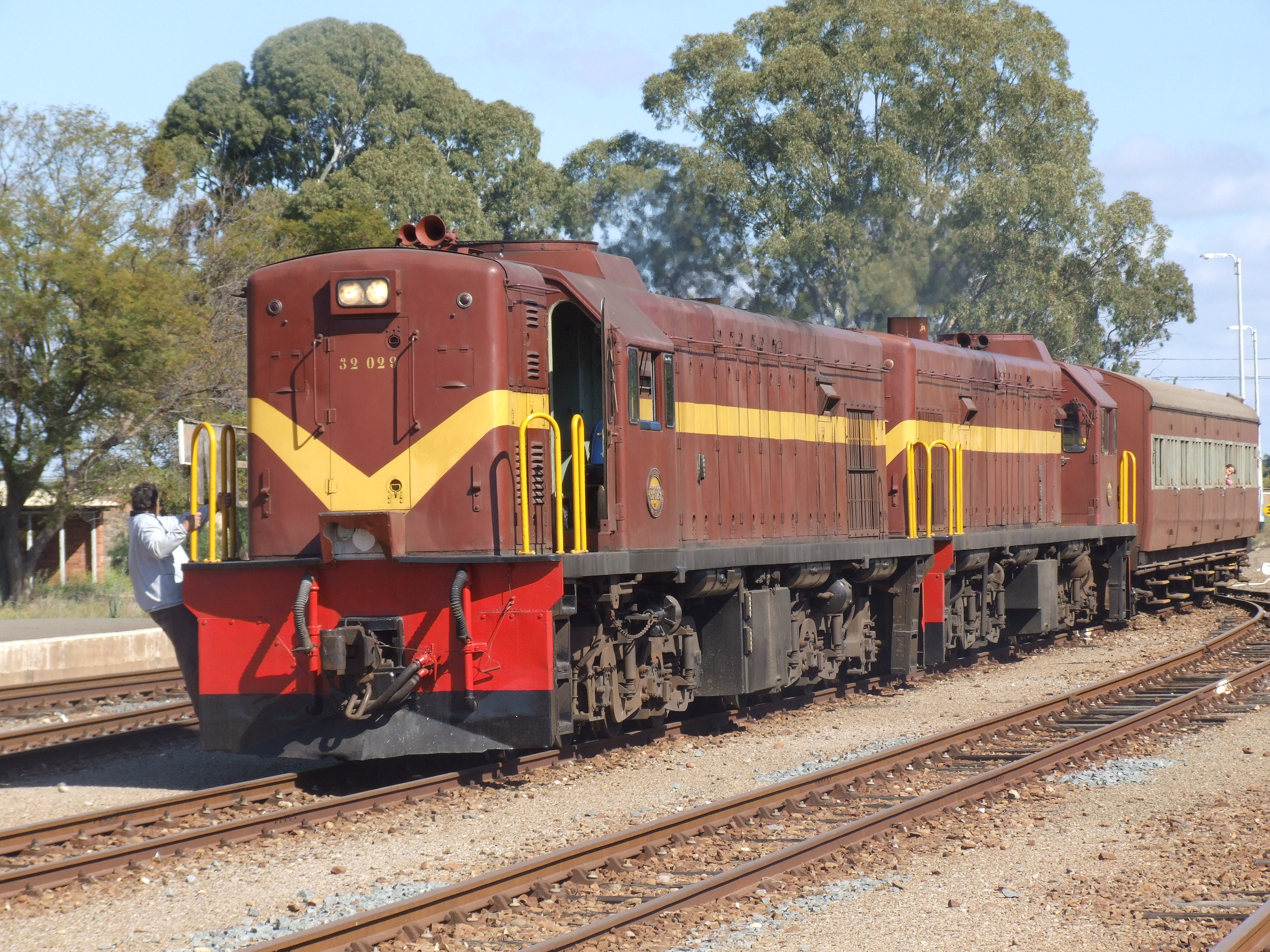
- No. 32-029 and 32-042 at Oudtshoorn, 22 September 2007
Type and origin
- Power type: Diesel-electric
- Designer: General Electric
- Builder: General Electric
- Serial number: 33722-33836
- Model: GE U18C1
- Build date: 1959-1961
- Total produced: 115
Specifications
- Configuration
  - AAR: 1-C+C-1
  - UIC: (1′Co)+(Co1′)
  - Commonwealth: 1Co+Co1
- Gauge: 3 ft 6 in (1,067 mm) Cape gauge
- Leading dia.: 762 mm (30.0 in)
- Wheel diameter: 915 mm (36.0 in)
- Wheelbase: 15,246 mm (50 ft 0.2 in)
  - Bogie: 4,927 mm (16 ft 2.0 in)
- Pivot centres: 8,128 mm (26 ft 8.0 in)
- Length
  - Over couplers: 16,866 mm (55 ft 4.0 in)
- Width: 2,756 mm (9 ft 0.5 in)
- Height: 3,924 mm (12 ft 10.5 in)
- Axle load: 12,700 kg (28,000 lb)
  - Leading: 10,160 kg (22,400 lb)
- Adhesive weight: 76,200 kg (168,000 lb)
- Loco weight: 96,520 kg (212,790 lb) max
- Fuel type: Diesel
- Fuel capacity: 4,300 litres (950 imp gal)
- Prime mover: Cooper-Bessemer FVBL-12
- RPM range: 400-1,000
  - RPM low idle: 400
  - RPM idle: 535
  - Maximum RPM: 1,000
- Engine type: 4 stroke V12 diesel
- Aspiration: C-B ET13 turbocharger
- Generator: DC 10 pole GE 5GT-581C5
- Traction motors: Six GE 5GE-761A3 DC 4 pole
  - Rating 1 hour: 600A
  - Continuous: 590A @ 17 km/h (11 mph)
- Gear ratio: 92:19
- MU working: 3 maximum
- Loco brake: 6-SLAV-1 with vigilance control
- Train brakes: Westinghouse 6CDX4UC compressor/exhauster
- Air tank cap.: 700 litres (150 imp gal)
- Compressor: 0.039 m^{3}/s (1.4 cu ft/s)
- Exhauster: 0.155 m^{3}/s (5.5 cu ft/s)
- Couplers: AAR knuckle (SASKOP DS)
Performance figures
- Maximum speed: 100 km/h (62 mph)
- Power output
  - Starting: 1,475 kW (1,978 hp)
  - Continuous: 1,340 kW (1,800 hp)
- Tractive effort
  - Starting: 183 kN (41,000 lbf) @ 25% adhesion
  - Continuous: 146 kN (33,000 lbf) @ 27 km/h (17 mph)
- Factor of adh.
  - Starting: 25%
  - Continuous: 20%
- Brakeforce: 60% ratio @ 345 kPa (50.0 psi)
Career
- Operators: South African Railways; Spoornet; SNCZ, Democratic Republic of the Congo; Consortium ARZ
- Class: Class 32-000
- Number in class: 115
- Numbers: 32-001 to 32-115
- Delivered: Nov 1959 to Nov 1961
- First run: 1959

The South African Railways Class 32-000 of 1959 was a diesel-electric locomotive.

Between November 1959 and November 1961, the South African Railways placed 115 Class 32-000 General Electric type U18C1 diesel-electric locomotives with a 1Co+Co1 wheel arrangement in service in South West Africa.

== Manufacturer ==
The South African Class 32-000 type GE U18C1 diesel-electric locomotive was designed and built to South African Railways (SAR) requirements by General Electric (GE) and imported. They were numbered in the range from 32-001 to 32-115.

== Class 32 series ==
The Class 32 consisted of two series, the high short hood Class 32-000 and the low short hood Class 32-200, both GE products and both with a 1Co+Co1 wheel arrangement. The short hood end was the front on both versions and both had single station controls.

== The pony truck affair ==
In the United States of America, the South African Class 32-000 is credited with being a major factor in the demise of the American Locomotive Company (Alco) and the rise of GE in the locomotive building business.

In the late 1950s South Africa, at the time one of the last bastions of steam traction, planned to embark on a massive dieselisation program. A SAR technical team was sent to Europe and the United States to prepare an assessment of design alternatives, finalise specifications and compile a list of qualified bidders.

In the United States only Alco, GE and General Motors Electro-Motive Division (EMD) were considered to be qualified bidders. The SAR was not very enthusiastic about two-stroke cycle prime movers and had a strong preference for Alco's Model 251 prime mover and GE's transmission systems. As a long-time prior supplier of steam locomotives for the SAR, Alco appeared to be virtually assured of receiving the order.

The SAR's tender for bid was issued in 1957, with two options:

- 115 1,800 horsepower (1,300 kilowatts) locomotives with a 1Co+Co1 wheel arrangement; or
- 230 1,000 horsepower (750 kilowatts) locomotives with a Co+Co wheel arrangement

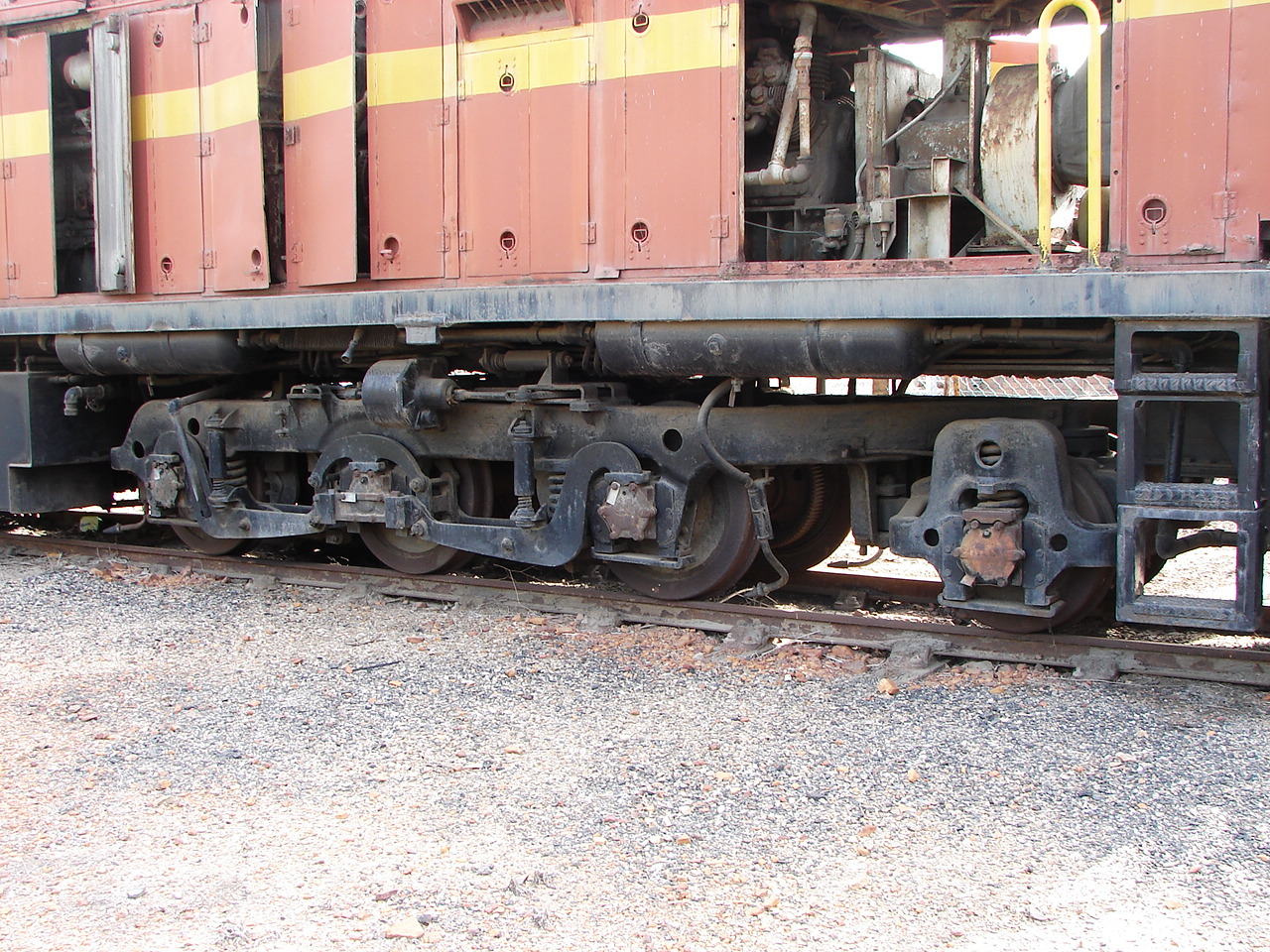
1Co bogie on no. 32-047

These units were intended for operation in South West Africa under very light rail conditions that necessitated lighter axle loadings which could not be achieved with conventional Co bogies under a heavy locomotive. General Steel Castings had a design on paper for a 1Co bogie, a Co bogie with an integral pony truck, which could be utilised by either Alco or GE and which would enable the SAR's specifications to be met for the heavier 1,800 horsepower (1,300 kilowatts) units.

The SAR made it clear that, despite the two options afforded by the tender, its strong preference was for a 1Co+Co1 locomotive. The use of a pony truck was not universally accepted by Alco's engineering management, however, and the result was that Alco bid on only the Co+Co option and lost out to GE, who had bid on both options.

In South Africa, this virtually opened the floodgates for GE since more than half of the SAR's vast diesel-electric locomotive fleet which was acquired between 1959 and 1981 were GE products.

There is debate whether the Pony Truck Affair was a consequential historical event or an idea retroactively proposed by railfans to explain the changing fortunes of ALCo and GE Transportation.

== Service ==
=== South African Railways ===
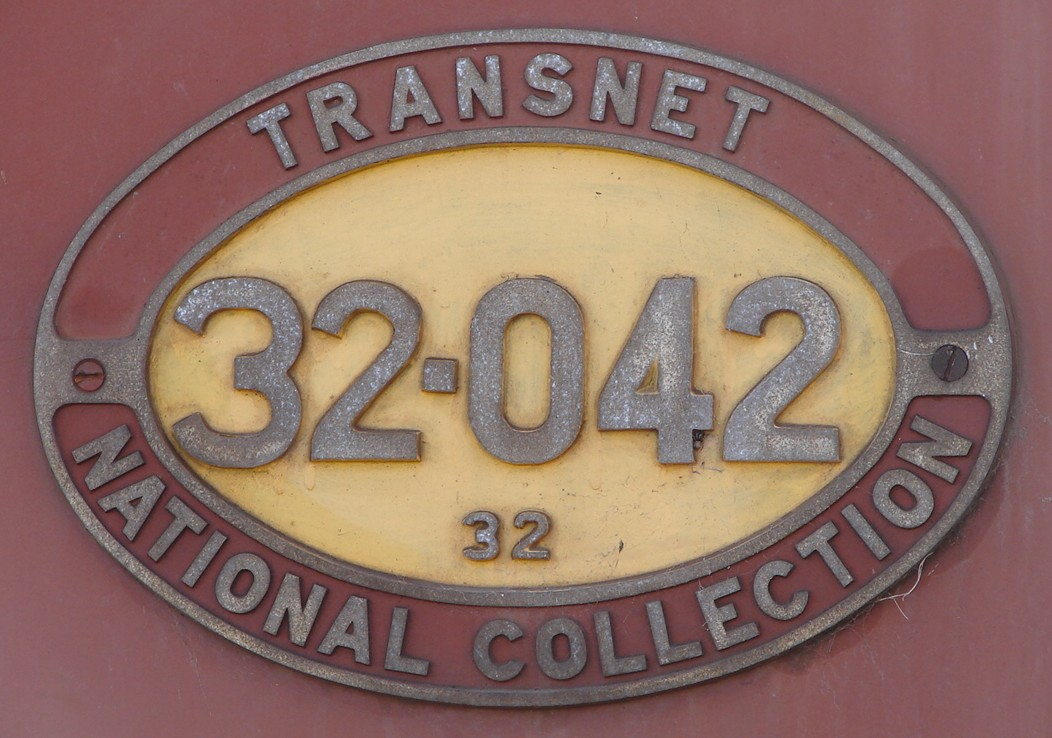

The Class 32-000 was designed specifically for service in SWA and most of them spent their entire SAR working lives there.

Some initially entered service at Germiston to work coal trains on the Witbank coal line where electrification was approaching completion. From Germiston they worked all sorts of traffic, including the Trans-Natal Express between Johannesburg and Volksrust. Ten of these units were temporarily allocated to De Aar in the last quarter of 1961 to work the mainline to Beaufort West. Between 1964 and 1976, several were also allocated to the Eastern Transvaal for service around Waterval Boven.

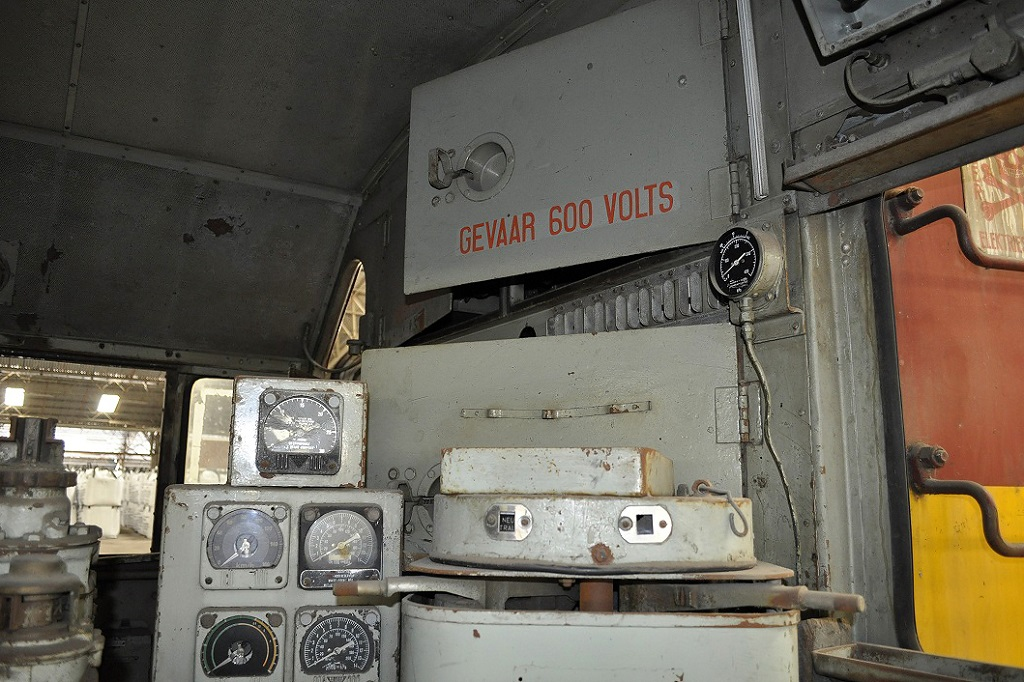
Cab of no. 32-021

Of the original 115 locomotives, only five survived into the Spoornet era in the 1990s. In SWA they began to be replaced by the Class 33-400 during the early 1970s. After being withdrawn from Spoornet service, a few were allocated to the National Collection, later the Transnet Heritage Foundation, and two of these, numbers 32-029 and 32-042, still saw occasional service as Outeniqua Choo-Tjoe excursion locomotives based at George, South Africa. Numbers 32-021 and 32-094 were staged at Danskraal for years and were sold in 2013, believed to be for further use by the buyer.

=== Post-SAR service ===
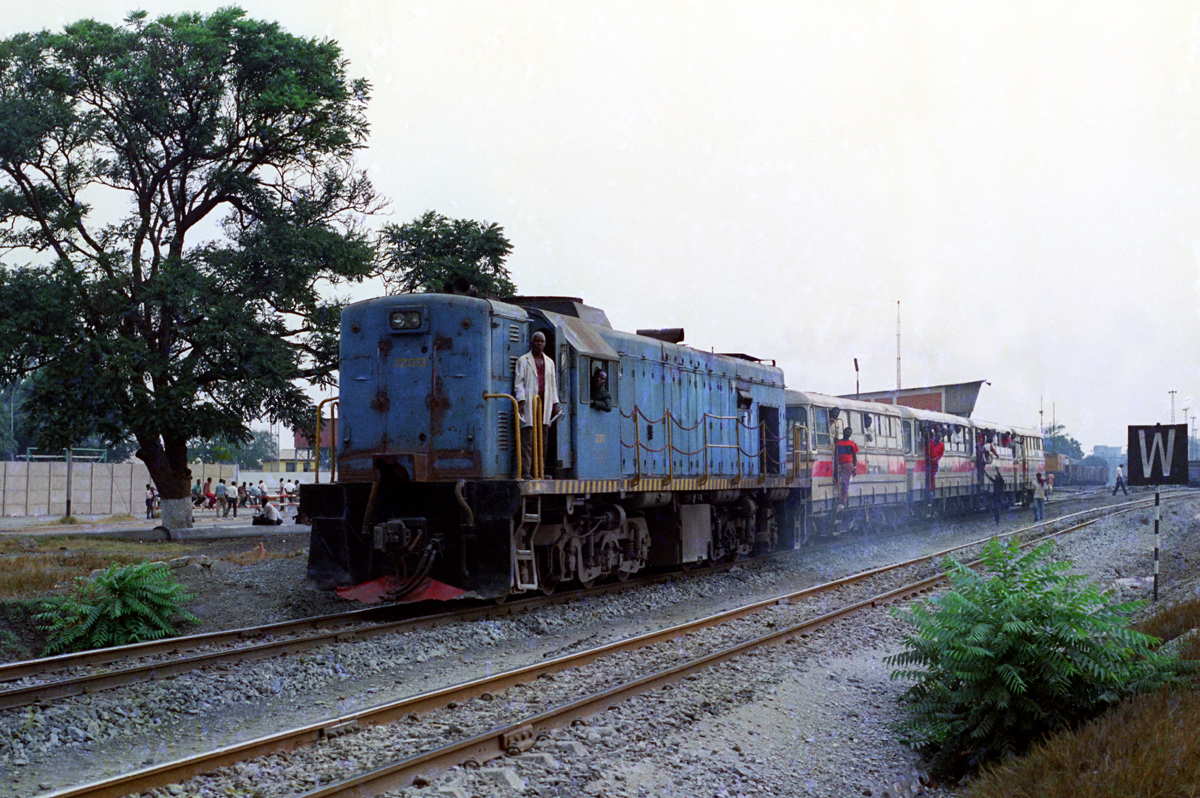
No. 32-013 at Nkana Mine, 30 September 1993

After withdrawal from SAR service in the 1980s, almost fifty of the Class 32-000 locomotives were sold to Zaire's Société Nationale des Chemins de Fer Zaïrois (SNCZ) which became the Société nationale des Chemins de fer du Congo (SNCC) after the country's name change to the Democratic Republic of the Congo. Of these at least one, SNCC no. 1405 (ex SAR no. 32-019) was seen on local workings around Lubumbashi in 2013.

Three went to Consortium ARZ (CARZ), an Italian per-way contractor working in Zaire and later also in Zambia.

Numbers 32-007, 32-010, 32-013, 32-069 and 32-113 went to Zambia, two to Nchanga and three to Nkana, two of the Zambian copper mines, where they were used on the mine systems at Nchanga and Kitwe on both ore trains and miner's passenger trains. The three locomotives at the Nkana Mine retained their SAR numbers. No. 32-013 is depicted alongside on the Nkana-Chibuluma miner's train at Nkana Mine Sidings in Zambia. The coaches behind it are second-hand Tata bus bodies mounted on freight wagon frames and bogies which were initially made for the Mulungushi Commuter train service in Lusaka, which was later taken over by Zambia Railways and renamed Njanji Commuter.

LEGE in Durban, who operates an active hire and overhaul business, owns two of these locomotives, numbers 32-070 and 32-084. Of these, no. 32-070 has been observed shunting in the Merewent Oil Refinery on the Bluff as late as 2014.

== Liveries ==
The class 32-000 were delivered in the new Gulf Red livery with yellow side-stripes and a yellow V on each end. They wore this livery throughout their SAR and Spoornet service life.

== Preservation ==
Four of the Class 32-000's have been preserved.

- 32002 incorrectly numbered 32001 is plinthed in Windhoek in Namibia.
- 32029 is preserved at The Railway Museum in George.
- 32042 is preserved at the Outeniqua Choo Tjoe Railway in George.
- 32047 preserved at Voorbaai Loco Depot.

== Works numbers ==
The Class 32-000 builder's works numbers and known disposition are listed in the table.

Class 32-000, GE type U18C1
Image	SAR no.	GE works no.	Post-SAR owner	Post-SAR no.
	32-001	33722		
	32-002	33723		
	32-003	33724		
	32-004	33725	SNCZ	32-004
	32-005	33726		
	32-006	33727	SNCZ	
	32-007	33728	Nchanga	26
	32-008	33729	SNCZ	
	32-009	33730	SNCZ	
	32-010	33731	Nkana	32-010
	32-011	33732		
	32-012	33733		
	32-013	33734	Nkana	32-013
	32-014	33735		
	32-015	33736		
	32-016	33737		
	32-017	33738	SNCZ	
	32-018	33739	SNCZ	
	32-019	33740	SNCZ	1405
	32-020	33741	SNCZ	
	32-021	33742		32-021
	32-022	33743	SNCZ	
	32-023	33744		
	32-024	33745		
	32-025	33746	SNCZ	
	32-026	33747		
	32-027	33748		
	32-028	33749		
	32-029	33750	THF	32-029
	32-030	33751	SNCZ	
	32-031	33752		
	32-032	33753		
	32-033	33754		
	32-034	33755	SNCZ	
	32-035	33756	SNCZ	
	32-036	33757	SNCZ	
	32-037	33758	SNCZ	
	32-038	33759		
	32-039	33760		
	32-040	33761		
	32-041	33762		
	32-042	33763	THF	32-042
	32-043	33764	SNCZ	1410-5
	32-044	33765		
	32-045	33766		
	32-046	33767		
	32-047	33768	THF	32-047
	32-048	33769		
	32-049	33770	SNCZ	
	32-050	33771	SNCZ	32-050
	32-051	33772	SNCZ	
	32-052	33773		
	32-053	33774		
	32-054	33775	SNCZ	
	32-055	33776		
	32-056	33777	CARZ	
	32-057	33778	CARZ	
	32-058	33779	SNCZ	
	32-059	33780		
	32-060	33781		
	32-061	33782	SNCZ	
	32-062	33783		
	32-063	33784		
	32-064	33785		
	32-065	33786		
	32-066	33787	SNCZ	
	32-067	33788	SNCZ	
	32-068	33789	SNCZ	
	32-069	33790	Nchanga	27
	32-070	33791	LEGE	
	32-071	33792	SNCZ	
	32-072	33793	SNCZ	
	32-073	33794		
	32-074	33795		
	32-075	33796	SNCZ	
	32-076	33797	SNCZ	
	32-077	33798		
	32-078	33799	SNCZ	
	32-079	33800		
	32-080	33801		
	32-081	33802	SNCZ	
	32-082	33803	SNCZ	
	32-083	33804		
	32-084	33805	LEGE	
	32-085	33806	SNCZ	
	32-086	33807	SNCZ	
	32-087	33808	CARZ	
	32-088	33809		
	32-089	33810	SNCZ	
	32-090	33811		
	32-091	33812	SNCZ	
	32-092	33813	SNCZ	
	32-093	33814	SNCZ	
	32-094	33815		32-094
	32-095	33816		
	32-096	33817		
	32-097	33818	SNCZ	
	32-098	33819	SNCZ	
	32-099	33820		
	32-100	33821	SNCZ	
	32-101	33822		
	32-102	33823	SNCZ	
	32-103	33824		
	32-104	33825		
	32-105	33826		
	32-106	33827		
	32-107	33828		
	32-108	33829		
	32-109	33830		
	32-110	33831	SNCZ	
	32-111	33832	SNCZ	
	32-112	33833	SNCZ	
	32-113	33834	Nkana	32-113
	32-114	33835	SNCZ	
	32-115	33836	SNCZ	

== Illustration ==
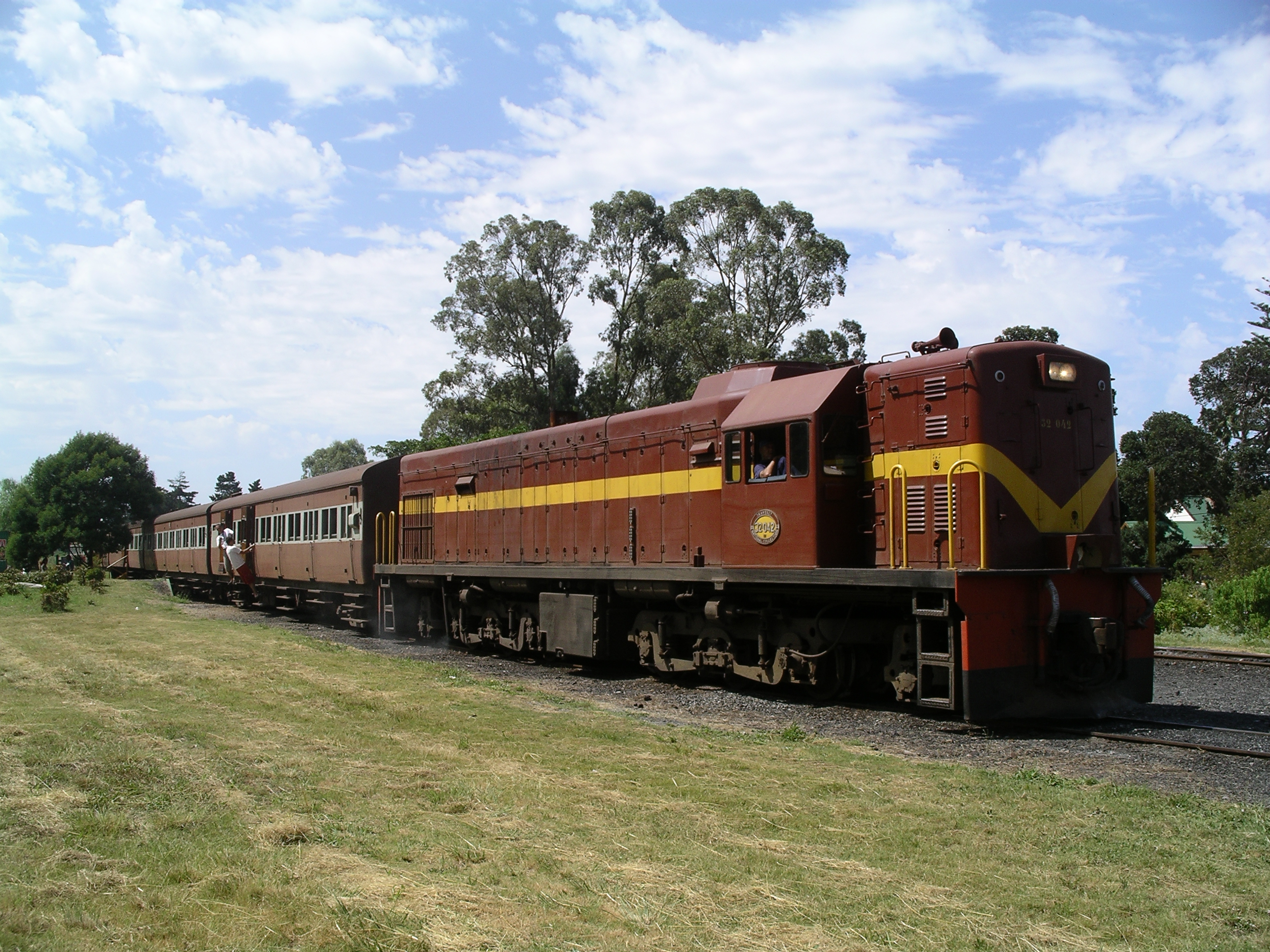
No. 32-042 on the Outeniqua Choo Tjoe, 16 February 2005

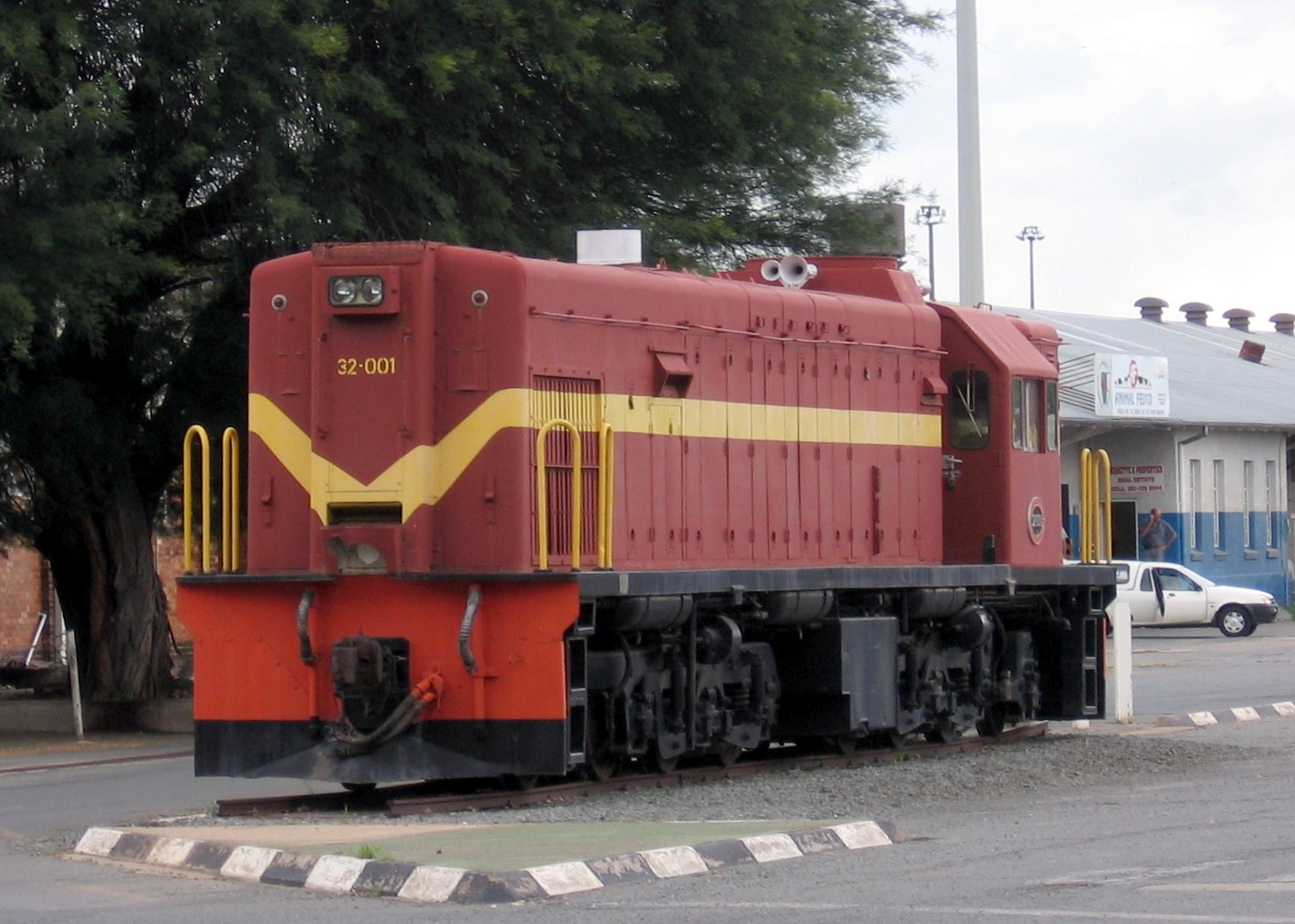
No. 32-002 renumbered to 32-001 and plinthed in Windhoek, 20 February 2006

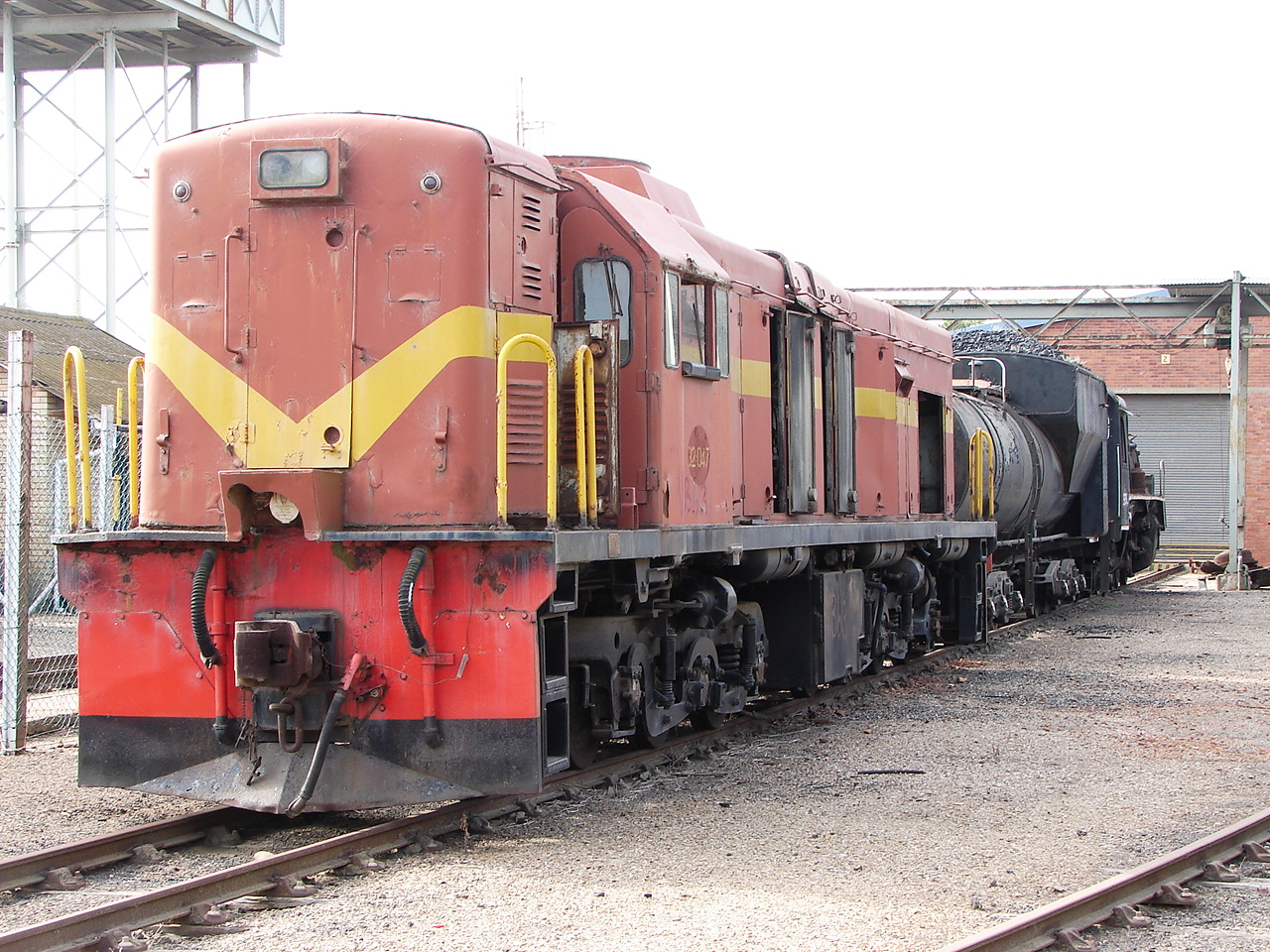
No. 32-047 staged at Voorbaai Depot near Mosselbaai, 15 April 2013
