= South African Class 32-200 =

Diesel-electric locomotive built in 1966

South African Class 32-200 TransNamib Class 32
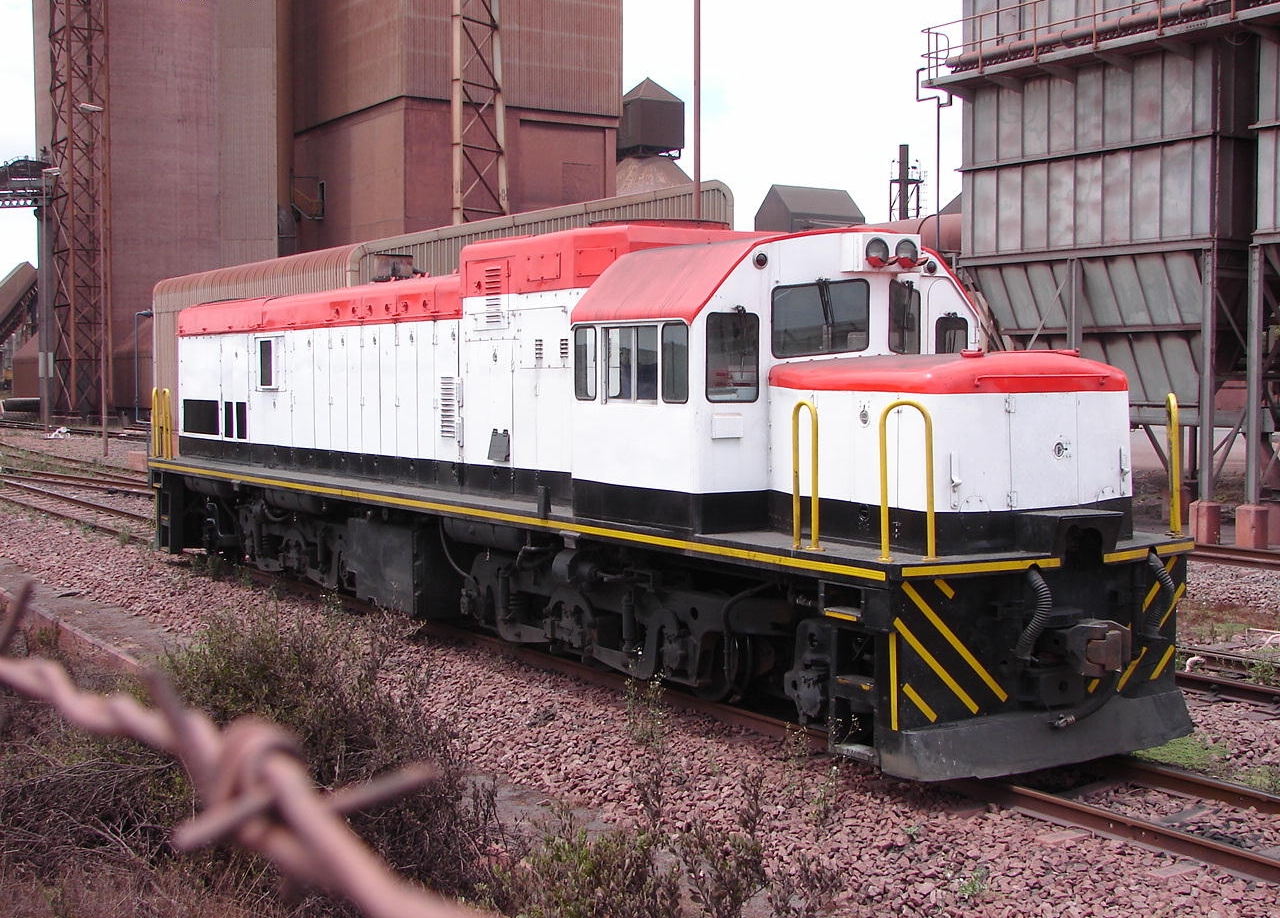
- PPC Saldanha's no. 32-202, 8 January 2009
Type and origin
- Power type: Diesel-electric
- Designer: General Electric
- Builder: General Electric
- Serial number: 35842-35851
- Model: GE U20C1
- Build date: 1966
- Total produced: 10
Specifications
- Configuration
  - AAR: 1-C+C-1
  - UIC: (1′Co)+(Co1′)
  - Commonwealth: 1Co+Co1
- Gauge: 3 ft 6 in (1,067 mm) Cape gauge
- Leading dia.: 762 mm (30.0 in)
- Wheel diameter: 915 mm (36.0 in)
- Wheelbase: 15,246 mm (50 ft 0.2 in)
  - Bogie: 4,927 mm (16 ft 2.0 in)
- Pivot centres: 8,128 mm (26 ft 8.0 in)
- Length
  - Over couplers: 16,866 mm (55 ft 4.0 in)
- Width: 2,756 mm (9 ft 0.5 in)
- Height: 3,928 mm (12 ft 10.6 in)
- Axle load: 12,700 kg (28,000 lb)
  - Leading: 10,160 kg (22,400 lb)
- Adhesive weight: 76,200 kg (168,000 lb)
- Loco weight: 96,520 kg (212,790 lb) max
- Fuel type: Diesel
- Fuel capacity: 4,300 litres (950 imp gal)
- Prime mover: GE 7FDL-12
- RPM range: 400–1,000
  - RPM low idle: 400
  - Maximum RPM: 1,000
- Engine type: 4 stroke diesel
- Aspiration: C-B ET13 turbocharger
- Generator: DC 10 pole GE 5GT-581C9
- Traction motors: Six GE 5GE-761A9 DC 4 pole
  - Rating 1 hour: 625A
  - Continuous: 615A @ 18 km/h (11 mph)
- Cylinders: V12
- Gear ratio: 92:19
- MU working: 4 maximum
- Loco brake: 28-LV-1 with vigilance control
- Train brakes: Westinghouse 6CDX4UC compressor/exhauster
- Air tank cap.: 700 litres (150 imp gal)
- Compressor: 0.029 m^{3}/s (1.0 cu ft/s)
- Exhauster: 0.116 m^{3}/s (4.1 cu ft/s)
- Couplers: AAR knuckle (SASKOP DS)
Performance figures
- Maximum speed: 100 km/h (62 mph)
- Power output
  - Starting: 1,475 kW (1,978 hp)
  - Continuous: 1,340 kW (1,800 hp)
- Tractive effort
  - Starting: 183 kN (41,000 lbf) @ 25% adhesion
  - Continuous: 146 kN (33,000 lbf) @ 27 km/h (17 mph)
- Factor of adh.
  - Starting: 25%
  - Continuous: 20%
- Brakeforce: 65% ratio @ 345 kPa (50.0 psi)
Career
- Operators: South African Railways; Spoornet; TransNamib; Sudan Railways; New Clydesdale; PPC Lime; Sheltam
- Class: Class 32-200
- Number in class: 10
- Numbers: 32-201 to 32-210
- Delivered: June and July 1966
- First run: 1966

The South African Railways Class 32-200 of 1966 was a diesel-electric locomotive.

In June and July 1966, the South African Railways placed ten Class 32-200 General Electric type U20C1 diesel-electric locomotives with a 1Co+Co1 wheel arrangement in service in South West Africa.

== Manufacturer ==
The Class 32-200 type GE U20C1 diesel-electric locomotive was designed and built to South African Railways (SAR) requirements by General Electric (GE) and imported. The ten locomotives were numbered in the range from 32-201 to 32-210.

== Class 32 series ==
The Class 32 consisted of two series, the high short hood Class 32-000 and the low short hood Class 32-200, both GE products and both with a 1Co+Co1 wheel arrangement. Both had single station controls.

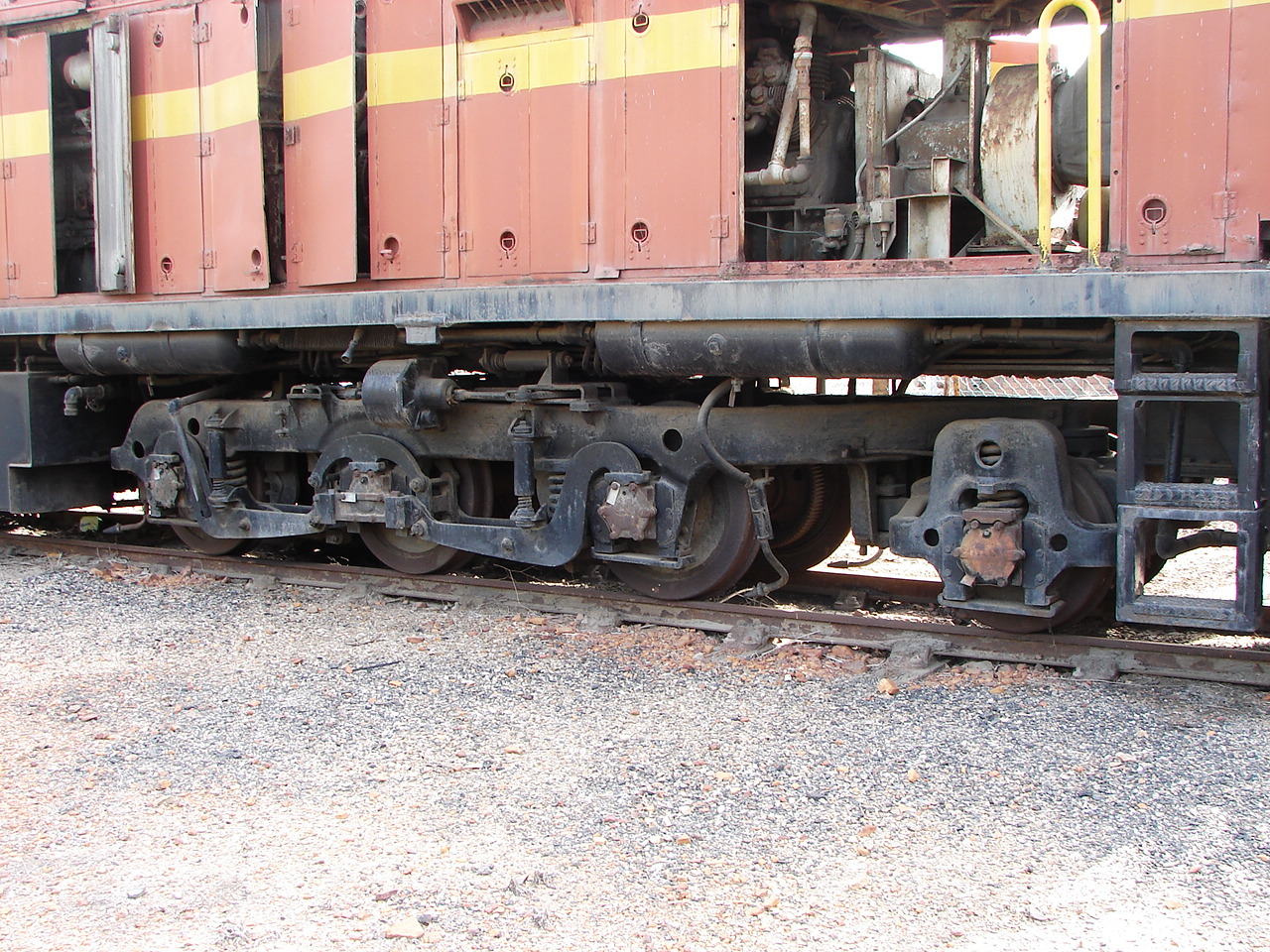
1Co bogie

Both versions ran on the same 1Co' bogies, three-axle Co' bogies with additional integral single axle pony trucks which was designed and produced by General Steel Castings. The fourth axle reduced the maximum axle loading sufficiently to enable these relatively heavy locomotives to operate on the very light rail which was used throughout South West Africa at the time.

The Class 32-200 was a more powerful low short hood version of the earlier Class 32-000 and was essentially a Class 33-000 locomotive on the bogies of the Class 32-000. This reduced its maximum axle load from the 15,749 kilograms (34,721 pounds) of the Class 33-000 to 12,700 kilograms (27,999 pounds). Apart from the bogies which necessitated a smaller fuel tank, its physical dimensions and exterior appearance were identical to that of the Class 33-000 and it used the same V12 prime mover.

== Service ==
=== South African Railways ===
While it was acquired specifically for service on light rail in South West Africa, the Class 32-200s also ended up being employed in South Africa at times. From 1972 to 1974, between the withdrawal of the Class GO 4-8-2+2-8-4 Garratt locomotives and the arrival of the Class 35-000 diesel-electrics on the line between Amabele and Umtata in Transkei, some of them performed temporary service on that line.

=== Post-SAR service ===
All ten locomotives survived and most were still in service by 2014.

- Numbers 32-201 and 32-203 are with Sheltam, renumbered 2012 and 2013, and have been working in Welkom.
- No. 32-202 works at the Pretoria Portland Cement lime plant in Saldanha.
- No. 32-204 works between the New Clydesdale Colliery near Witbank and the Transnet Freight Rail sidings at Bezuidenhoutsrust.
- Numbers 32-205 to 32-208 are still with TransNamib, the Namibian railway, renumbered 205 to 208 and with a couple believed to still be in regular use.
- Numbers 32-209 and 32-210 were sold to Sudan Railways.

== Liveries ==
The class 32-000 were delivered in the new Gulf Red livery with yellow side-stripes on the long hood and a yellow V on each end. They wore this livery throughout their SAR service life.

== Works numbers ==
The Class 32-200 builder's works numbers and disposition are listed in the table.

Class 32-200, type GE U20C1
Image	SAR no.	GE works no.	Post-SAR owner	Post-SAR no.
	32-201	35842	Sheltam	2012
	32-202	35843	PPC	
	32-203	35844	Sheltam	2013
	32-204	35845	New Clydesdale	
	32-205	35846	TransNamib	205
	32-206	35847	TransNamib	206
	32-207	35848	TransNamib	207
	32-208	35849	TransNamib	208
	32-209	35850	Sudan Railways	
	32-210	35851	Sudan Railways	

== Illustration ==
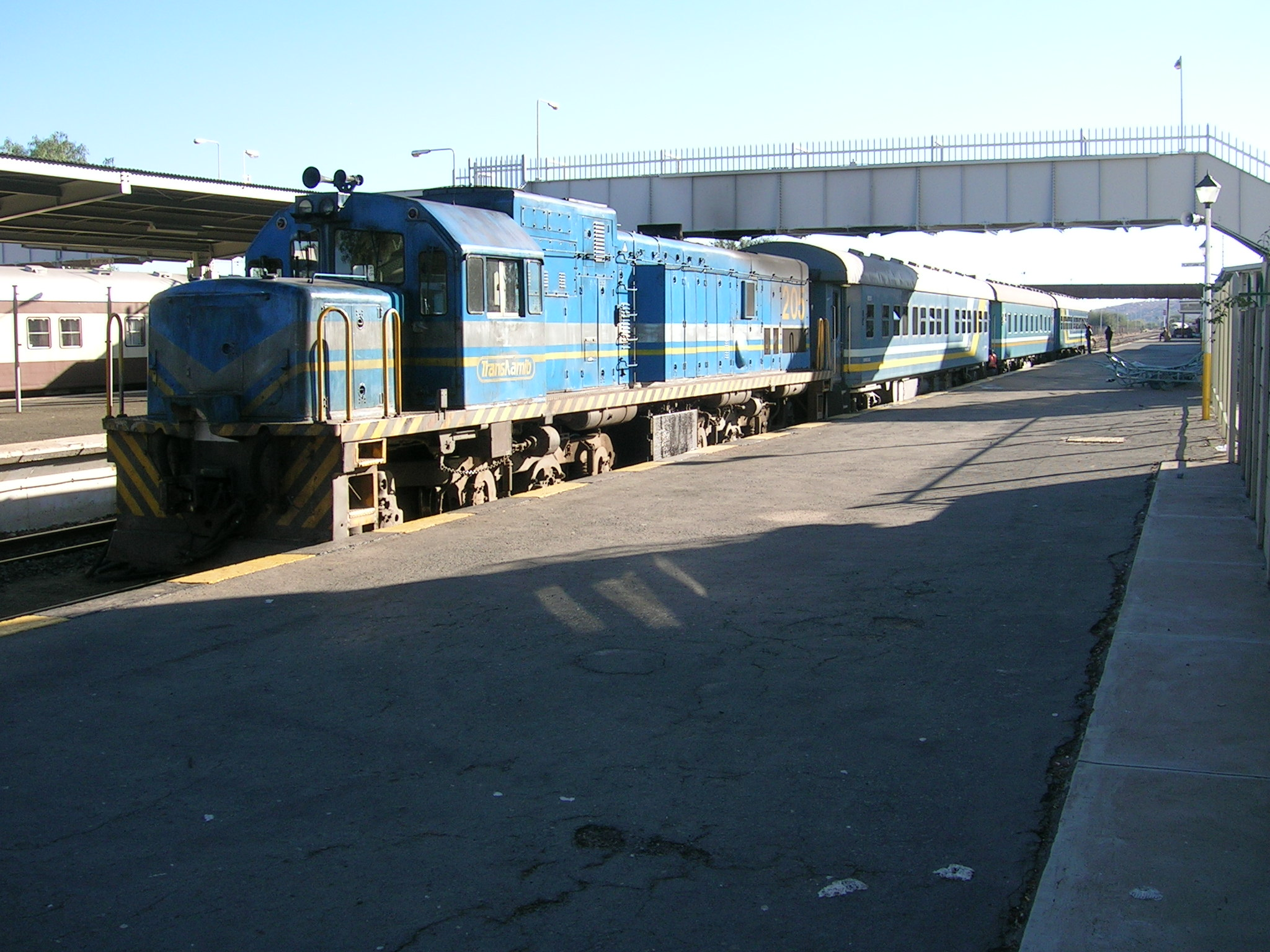
TransNamib's no. 205 at Windhoek station, Namibia, 26 June 2010
