= 4-6-2 =

Locomotive wheel arrangement

4-6-2 (Pacific)
- Front of locomotive at left

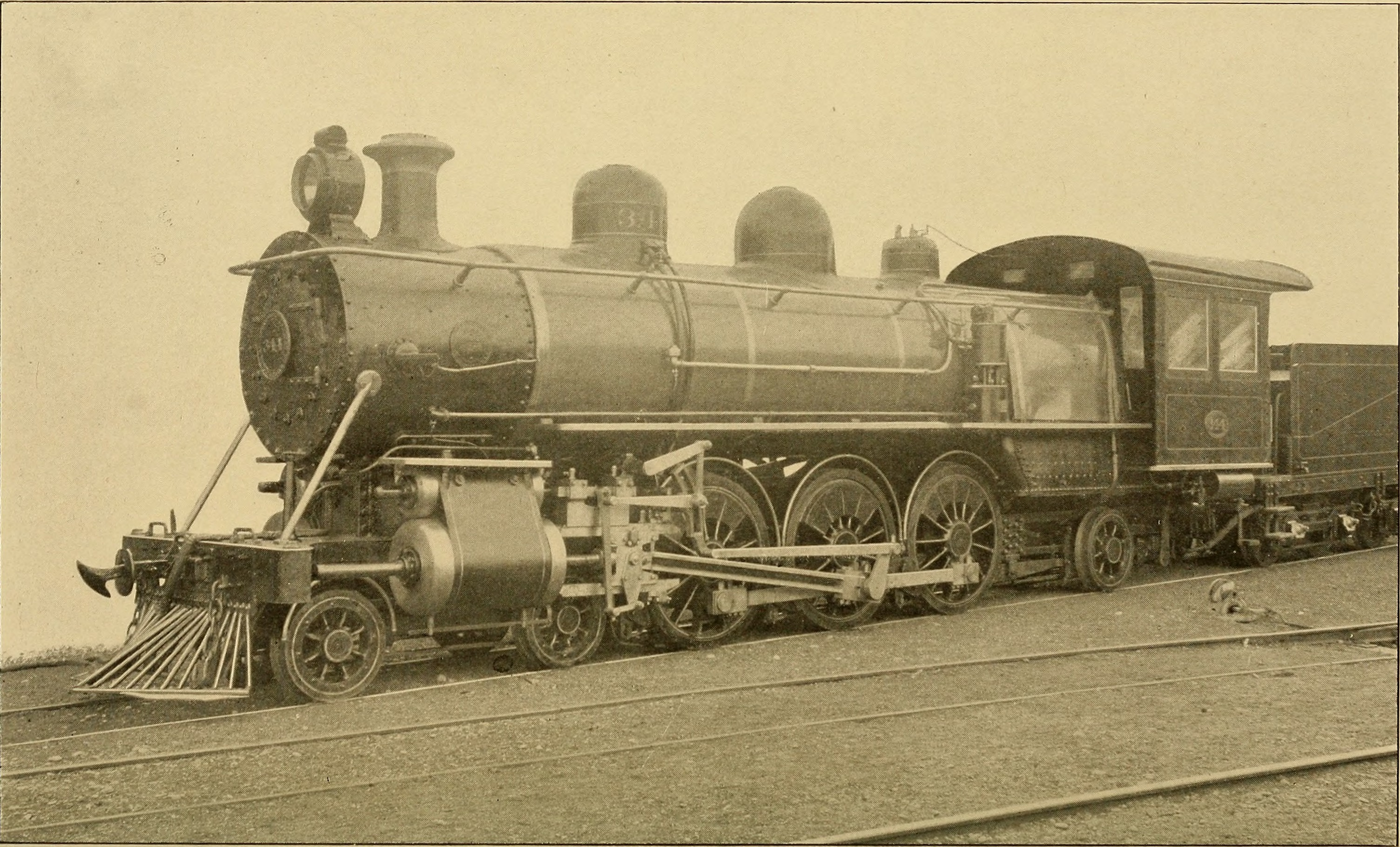
- New Zealand's Q class, considered to be the first true Pacific locomotive
Equivalent classifications
- UIC class: 2C1 (refined to 2′C′1′ or 2′C1′)
- French class: 231
- Turkish class: 36
- Swiss class: 3/6
- Russian class: 2-3-1
First known tank engine version
- First use: 1896
- Country: Australia
- Locomotive: Q class
- Railway: Western Australian Government Railways
First known tender engine version
- First use: 1887
- Country: United States of America
- Railway: Lehigh Valley Railroad
- Evolved from: 4-6-0
- Evolved to: 4-6-4
- Benefits: Larger firebox than the 4-6-0
- Drawbacks: Required piloting (also known as double heading) when train lengths increased
First known "True type" version
- First use: 1901
- Country: New Zealand
- Locomotive: Q class
- Railway: New Zealand Railways Department
- Designer: Alfred Beattie
- Builder: Baldwin Locomotive Works
- Evolved from: 4-4-2, 4-6-0 & 2-6-2
- Evolved to: 4-6-4, 4-8-2
- Benefits: Wide and deep firebox behind coupled wheels

Under the Whyte notation for the classification of steam locomotives, 4-6-2 represents the wheel arrangement of four leading wheels on two axles, six powered and coupled driving wheels on three axles and two trailing wheels on one axle. The 4-6-2 locomotive became almost globally known as a Pacific type after a locomotive built by the Baldwin Locomotive Works in Philadelphia was shipped across the Pacific Ocean to New Zealand.

== Overview ==
The introduction to New Zealand of the 4-6-2 design in 1901 has been described as "a veritable milestone in locomotive progress". On many railways worldwide, Pacific steam locomotives provided the motive power for express passenger trains throughout much of the early to mid-20th century, before either being superseded by larger types in the late 1940s and 1950s, or replaced by electric or diesel-electric locomotives during the 1950s and 1960s. Nevertheless, new Pacific designs continued to be built until the mid-1950s.

The type is generally considered to be an enlargement of the 4-4-2 Atlantic type, although its prototype had a direct relationship to the 4-6-0 Ten-wheeler and 2-6-2 Prairie, effectively being a combination of the two types. The success of the type can be attributed to a combination of its four-wheel leading truck which provided better stability at speed than a 2-6-2 Prairie, the six driving wheels which allowed for a larger boiler and the application of more tractive effort than the earlier 4-4-2 Atlantic, and the two-wheel trailing truck, first used on the New Zealand 2-6-2 Prairie of 1885. This permitted the firebox to be located behind the high driving wheels and thereby allowed it to be both wide and deep, unlike the 4-6-0 Ten-wheeler which had either a narrow and deep firebox between the driving wheels or a wide and shallow one above.

The type is well-suited to high speed running. The world speed record for steam traction of 126 miles per hour (203 kilometres per hour) has been held by a British Pacific locomotive, the Mallard, since 3 July 1938.

=== Development ===
The two earliest 4-6-2 locomotives, both created in the United States, were experimental designs which were not perpetuated. In 1887, the Lehigh Valley Railroad experimented with a 4-6-0 Ten-wheeler design with a Strong's patent firebox, a cylindrical device behind the cab which required an extension of the frame and the addition of two trailing wheels to support it. In 1889, the Chicago, Milwaukee & St Paul Railway rebuilt a conventional 4-6-0 with trailing wheels as a means of reducing its axle load.

In 1896, six 1067 mm (3 ft 6 in) narrow-gauge Q class 4-6-2 tank locomotives were introduced on the Western Australian Government Railways.

The first true Pacific, designed as such with a large firebox aft of the coupled wheels and also running on 1067 mm (3 ft 6 in) narrow gauge, was ordered in 1901 by the New Zealand Railways Department (NZR) from the Baldwin Locomotive Works of Philadelphia, Pennsylvania. The NZR Chief Mechanical Engineer, Alfred Beattie, ordered thirteen new Q class locomotives with a sufficiently large Wootten firebox to efficiently burn poor grade lignite coal from eastern South Island mines. Even before they had completed the order from New Zealand, the Baldwin engineers realised the advantages of this new type, and incorporated it into standard designs for other customers. The design was soon widely adopted by designers throughout the world.

=== Origin of the name ===
There are different opinions concerning the origin of the name Pacific. The design was a natural enlargement of the existing Baldwin 4-4-2 Atlantic type, but the type name may also be in recognition of the fact that a New Zealand designer had first proposed it. Usually, however, new wheel arrangements were named for, or named by, the railroad which first used the type in the United States. In the case of the Pacific, that was the Missouri Pacific Railroad in 1902.

=== Global popularity ===
The Pacific type was used on mainline railways around the world. The railways of New Zealand and Australia were the first in the world to run large numbers of Pacific locomotives, having introduced 4-6-2 types in 1901 and 1902 respectively and operating them until the 1960s.

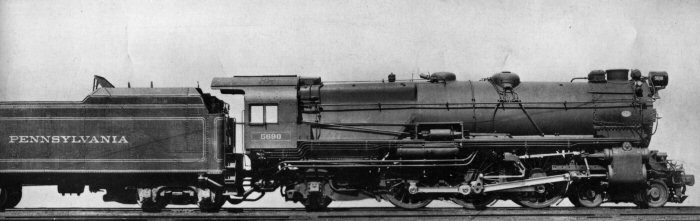
Builder's photograph of Pennsylvania Railroad K5 class no. 5698 in 1929

During the first half of the 20th century, the Pacific rapidly became the predominant passenger steam power in North America. Between 1902 and 1930, about 6,800 locomotives of the type were built by North American manufacturers for service in the United States and Canada. With exported locomotives included, about 7,300 were built in total. About 45% of these were built by the American Locomotive Company (ALCO) which became the main builder of the type, and 28% by Baldwin. Large numbers were also used in South America, most of which were supplied by manufacturers in the United Kingdom, the United States and Germany.

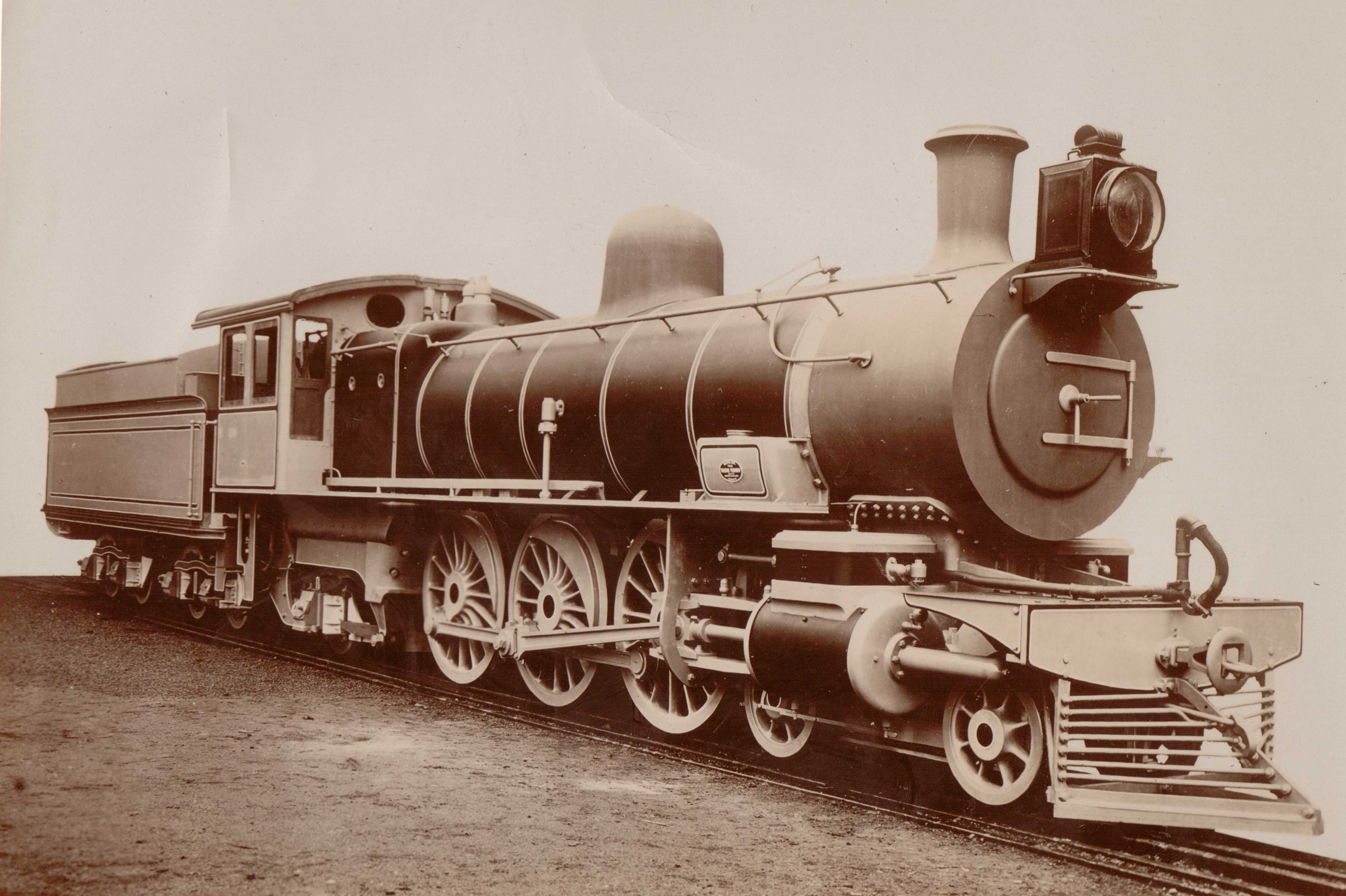
Cape Government Railways Enlarged Karoo Class, South African Railways Class 5

Africa was the third continent upon which the Pacific was regularly used, following the introduction of the Karoo class on the Cape Government Railways in the Cape of Good Hope in 1903. The earliest African examples were built in the United Kingdom by Kitson & Company.

The earliest examples of the Pacific in Europe were two French prototypes, introduced in 1907 and designed by the Compagnie du chemin de fer de Paris à Orléans (PO) to overcome the insufficient power of their 4-4-2 Atlantics. Within a few weeks, these were followed by a German Pacific type that, although already designed in 1905, only entered service in late 1907. The next was a British type, introduced in January 1908. By the outbreak of World War I, the type was being widely used on the railways of Continental Europe.

The Pacific type was introduced into Asia in 1907, the same year that it was first used in Europe. By the 1920s, Pacifics were being used by many railways throughout the Asian continent.

In 1923, the Pacific gave its name to Arthur Honegger's orchestral work, Pacific 231, which successfully reflectively interprets the emotive sounds of a steam locomotive. (231 after the French system of counting axles rather than wheels.)

=== Tank locomotives ===
During the first two decades of the 20th century, the Pacific wheel arrangement enjoyed limited popularity on tank locomotives. On a 4-6-2T locomotive, the trailing wheels support the coal bunker rather than an enlarged firebox and such a locomotive is therefore actually a tank engine version of the 4-6-0 Ten-wheeler tender locomotive. Indeed, many of the earliest examples were either rebuilt from tender locomotives or shared their basic design.

Around 1920, it became apparent to designers that the 4-6-2T wheel arrangement allowed a too limited bunker size for most purposes, with the result that most later designs of large suburban tank classes were of the 4-6-4T Hudson or 2-6-4T Adriatic wheel arrangement.

=== Lifespan ===
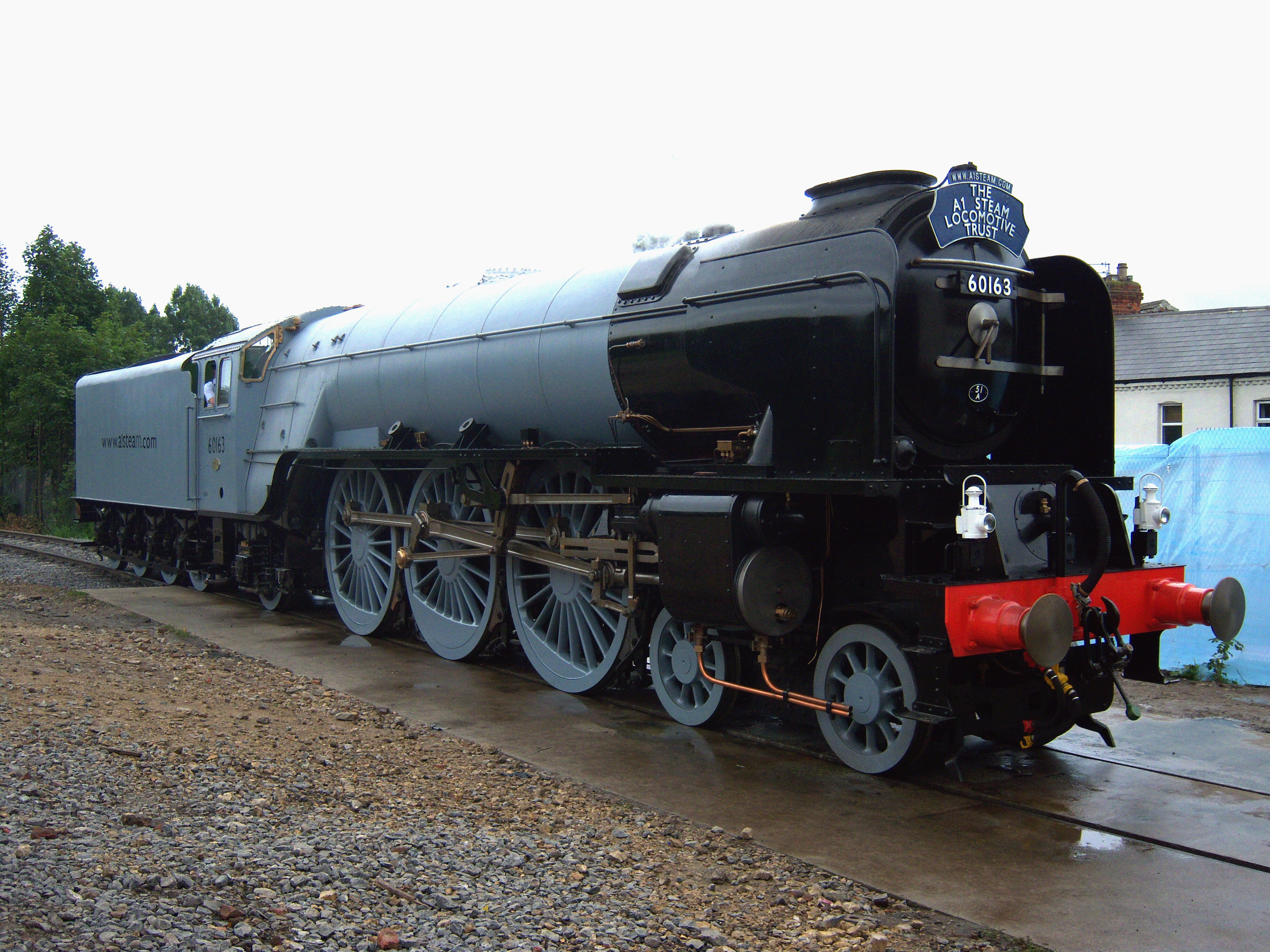
The LNER Peppercorn Class A1 60163 Tornado, built in 2008

The Pacific became the major express passenger locomotive type on many railways throughout the 1920s, 1930s and 1940s. Examples were also built for fast freight and mixed traffic duties. However, due to the increasing weight of trains during the 1940s, larger developments of the type became necessary in the United States and elsewhere. The most notable of these was the 4-6-4 Hudson or Baltic type, which had a four-wheel trailing bogie that permitted an even larger firebox, albeit at a loss of some adhesive weight, and the 4-8-2 Mountain type which used an extra pair of driving wheels to deliver more tractive effort to the rails. Nevertheless, the Pacific type remained widely used on express passenger trains until the end of steam traction. The last examples were built in the United Kingdom and Japan in the mid-1950s. British Railways introduced its BR Standard Class 6 and BR Standard Class 7 designs in 1951 and 1952, and the final United Kingdom design, the BR Standard Class 8, in 1954.

However, the story of the 4-6-2 type did not end in the 1960s. One further mainline example of the LNER Peppercorn Class A1, No. 60163 Tornado, was completed at Darlington by the A1 Steam Locomotive Trust in 2008. Designed to meet modern safety and certification standards, Tornado runs on the United Kingdom's rail network and on mainline-connected heritage railways.

== Usage ==
=== Argentina ===
The Vulcan Foundry built twenty Pacific locomotives for the former Buenos Aires Great Southern Railway (BAGSR) in 1926, two of which still survive. A further single 12B class locomotive was built in 1930, and the 12K class of twelve Pacific locomotives was built for the BAGSR by Vulcan in 1938.

In 1930, the Central Argentine Railway (Ferrocarril Central Argentino or FCCA) ordered twenty large three-cylinder PS11 class Pacific locomotives with Caprotti valve gear, which were at the time the most powerful locomotives on the FCCA. In 1939, one of these set up a South American speed record, averaging 65.7 miles per hour (105.7 kilometres per hour) on the El Cordobes express across the 188 miles (303 kilometres) non-stop run from Rosario to Buenos Aires, hauling a 500-ton train and at times attaining a maximum speed of nearly 100 miles per hour (160 kilometres per hour).

The Vulcan Foundry built a further fifty locomotives of a modernised PS12 class version of this design for the nationalised Ferrocarriles Argentinos (FCA) between 1950 and 1953.

=== Australia ===
In Australia, the first example of the wheel arrangement was the Q class tank locomotive of the 3 ft 6 in (1067 mm) gauge Western Australian Government Railways (WAGR). The six 4-6-2T locomotives were introduced in 1896, but four of them were soon converted to a 4-6-4T Hudson configuration.

The WAGR was the largest user of Pacific tender types in Australia. In total, the WAGR operated at least 223 4-6-2 locomotives, acquired between 1902 and 1950, making it by far its most numerous wheel arrangement.

- The first simple expansion (simplex) 4-6-2 tender locomotives in Australia were ordered from British manufacturers for the WAGR. However, due to slow delivery times by the British companies as a result of full order books and their preference for larger orders, twenty compound expansion 4-6-2 locomotives were also ordered from Baldwin Locomotive Works in Pennsylvania and placed in service in 1902, designated the Ec class. From 1923, these locomotives, designed for heavy goods and passenger traffic, were converted into light-lines L class engines, but without altering their 4-6-2 wheel arrangement.
- The British-built locomotives, the WAGR E class, were built by Nasmyth, Wilson & Company, North British Locomotive Company (NBL) and Vulcan Foundry between 1902 and 1912. These were the first of the type to be introduced in quantity, with 65 locomotives in the class.
- Other Pacific type locomotives operated by the WAGR included the twenty-strong C class, introduced in 1902, which were converted from a 4-6-0 to a 4-6-2 wheel arrangement from 1909.

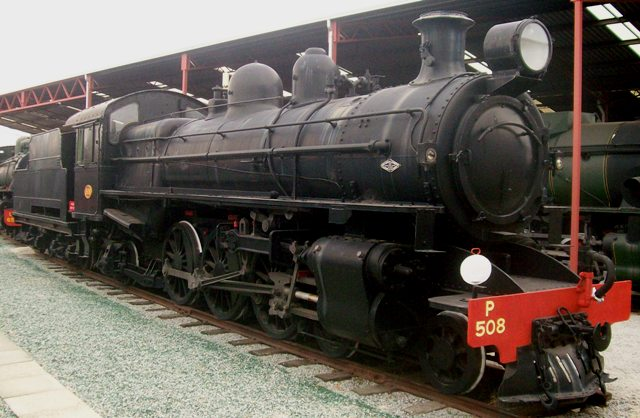
Western Australian Government Railways P class no. 508

- It was not until the introduction of the WAGR P class in 1924 that Western Australia received what many considered a true Pacific, a large, well balanced locomotive designed primarily for fast passenger traffic. The P class consisted of 25 locomotives, built in 1924 and 1925 by NBL as well as locally at the WAGR's Midland Railway Workshops. The P class engines revolutionised express passenger travel in Western Australia by drastically reducing passenger travel times between destinations.
- The first batch of ten WAGR Pr River class locomotives, named after prominent rivers in Western Australia and with a boiler pressure rating of 175 pounds per square inch (1,210 kilopascals) compared to the 160 pounds per square inch (1,100 kilopascals) of the P class, were built in 1938 at the Midland Railway Workshops. Between 1941 and 1944, eight of the P class locomotives were also converted to Pr class. One of them was preserved.
- The WAGR U class of fourteen oil burning locomotives, one of which was preserved, were purchased from NBL in 1946 as surplus war-work engines, following the World War II.
- The WAGR's final Pacific design was its Pm and Pmr classes of 35 locomotives, introduced in 1950, five of which have been preserved. These locomotives were intended to replace the Pr class, but were quickly relegated to goods workings after proving to be rigid steamers.

The 3 ft 6 in (1,067 mm) Midland Railway of Western Australia, one of the longest-lived privately owned railways in Australia, followed the WAGR's example by introducing five class C locomotives which were built by Kitson & Company to the Karoo design of the Cape Government Railways as basis.

In the 1920s, heavy Pacific locomotives were introduced by both South Australian Railways (SAR) and Victorian Railways (VR), in response to increasingly heavy passenger trains and the demand for faster services. Although similar in size, power and top speed, their designs reflected different approaches.

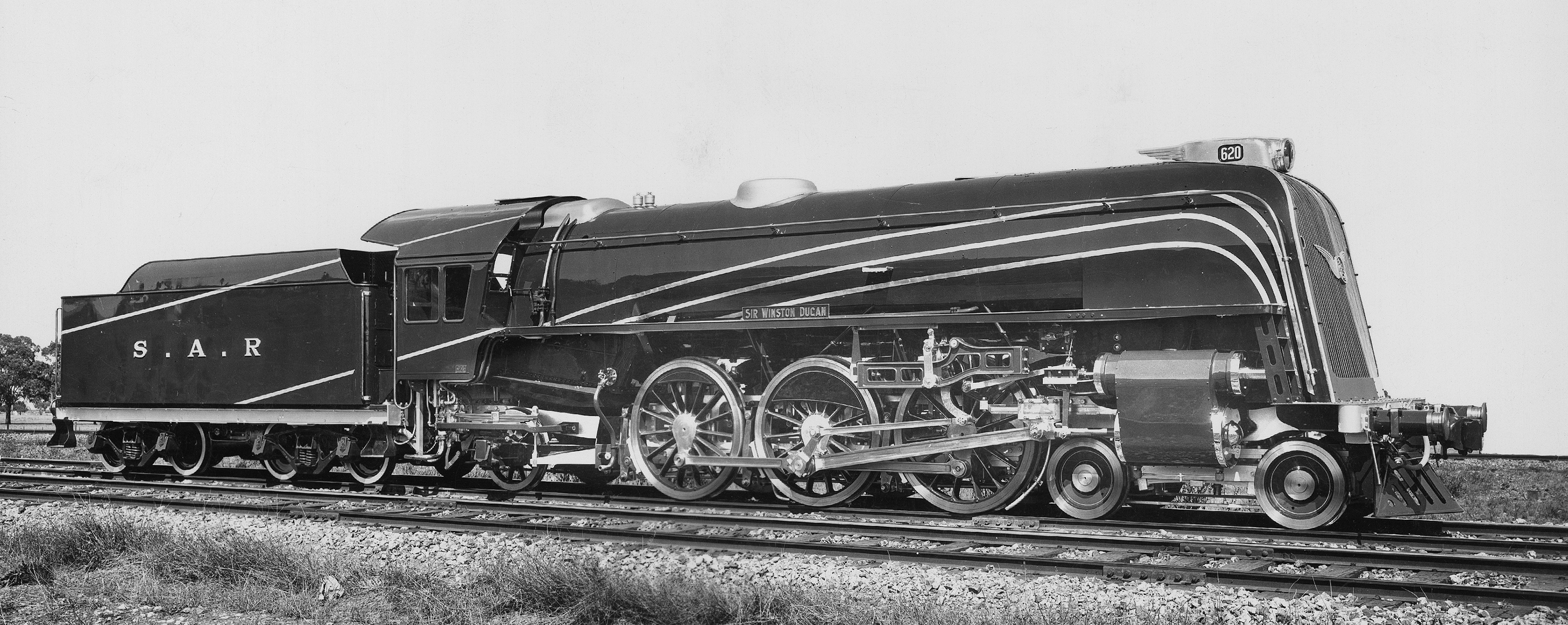
South Australian Railways 620 class Pacific class-leader no. 620 in 1936

- The 10 locomotives of the SAR 600 class, with two large 24-by-28-inch (610 mm × 710 mm) cylinders, were an adaptation of a United States Railroad Administration design. They were supplied by Armstrong Whitworth of the United Kingdom in 1922. The SAR later introduced another 10 Pacific locomotives, the smaller 620 class, which were designed at the SAR's Islington Workshops and built there between 1936 and 1938.

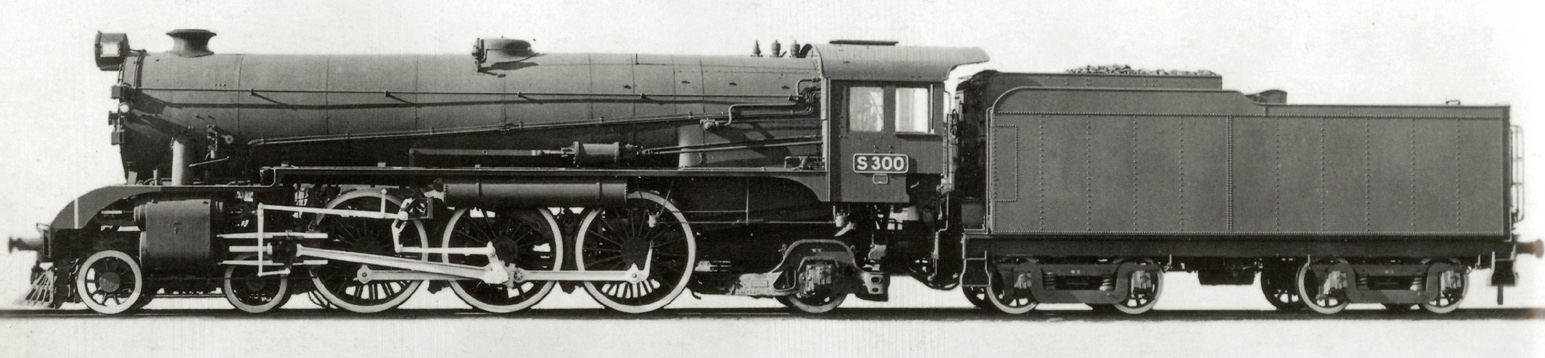
Victorian Railways S class, 1938

- The VR S class, on the other hand, showed a strong British London & North Eastern Railway influence, with three 20 1/2-by-28-inch (520 mm × 710 mm) cylinders and with Gresley conjugated valve gear driving the third inside cylinder. The VR's four S class locomotives were built at Newport Works between 1928 and 1930.

The VR also built a 4-6-2T locomotive class, the Dde class that was developed from a successful Dd class 4-6-0T design in 1908, intended for outer suburban passenger services in Melbourne.

The 3 ft 6 in (1067 mm) gauge Queensland Railways (QR) had two Pacific locomotive classes. Between 1926 and 1947, 83 B18¼ class 4-6-2s were introduced to haul mail trains. The prototype, built by QR's Ipswich Workshops, began trial runs on 16 July 1926 and was followed by two batches of eight locomotives in 1927 and 1929. The last locomotive of this class was delivered in 1947. In 1950, QR ordered 35 BB18¼ class locomotives from Vulcan Foundry, developed from the successful B18¼ class. Another twenty were built by Walkers Limited of Maryborough between 1955 and 1958. Of these, no. 1089 was the last mainline steam locomotive to be built in Australia.

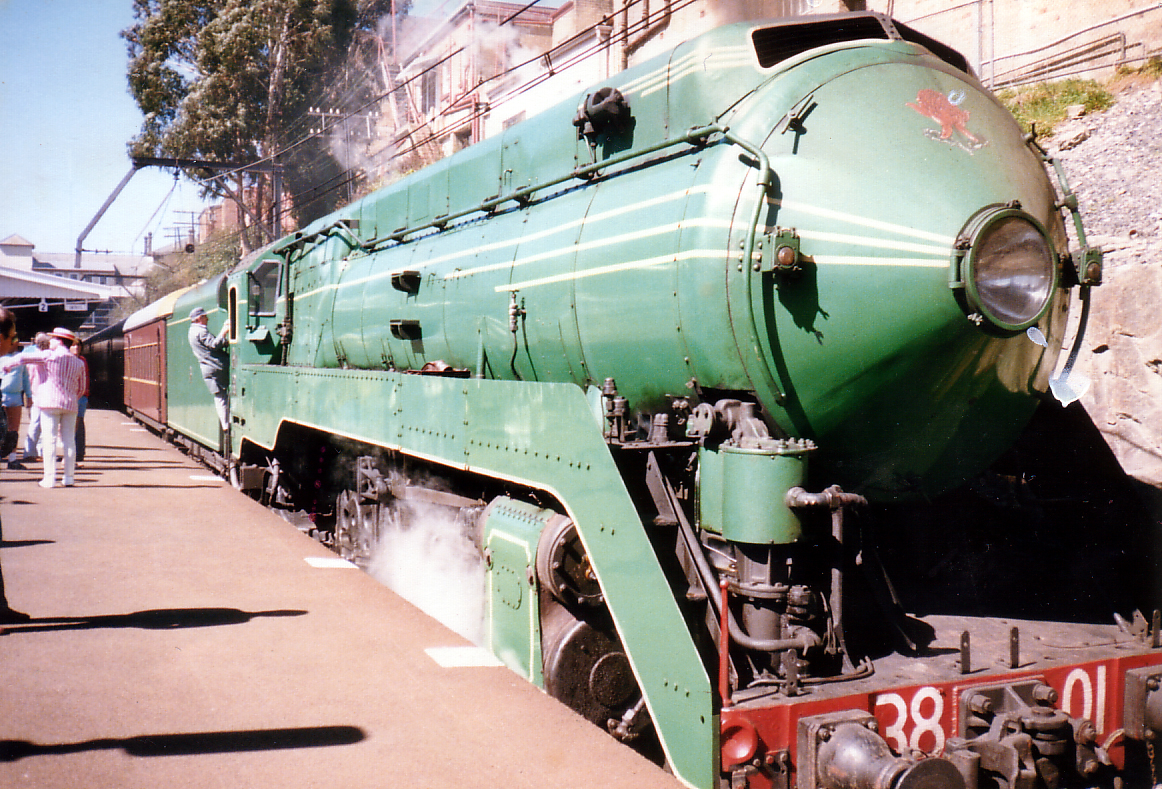
New South Wales Government Railways 3801

The New South Wales Government Railways (NSWGR) introduced its C38 class for express passenger service in 1943. These two-cylinder Pacifics had a free-steaming 245-pound-per-square-inch (1,690 kPa) boiler and were renowned for their performance. Class leader 3801 achieved considerable fame in preservation, with notable feats such as hauling the Western Endeavour, a transcontinental journey from Sydney to Perth in 1970.

The Tasmanian Government Railways owned fourteen Pacific locomotives. Four R class were built for passenger trains by Perry Engineering in Adelaide and ten M class were built by Robert Stephenson & Hawthorns in 1951, and were used on all trains on major lines in northern Tasmania.

=== Austria ===
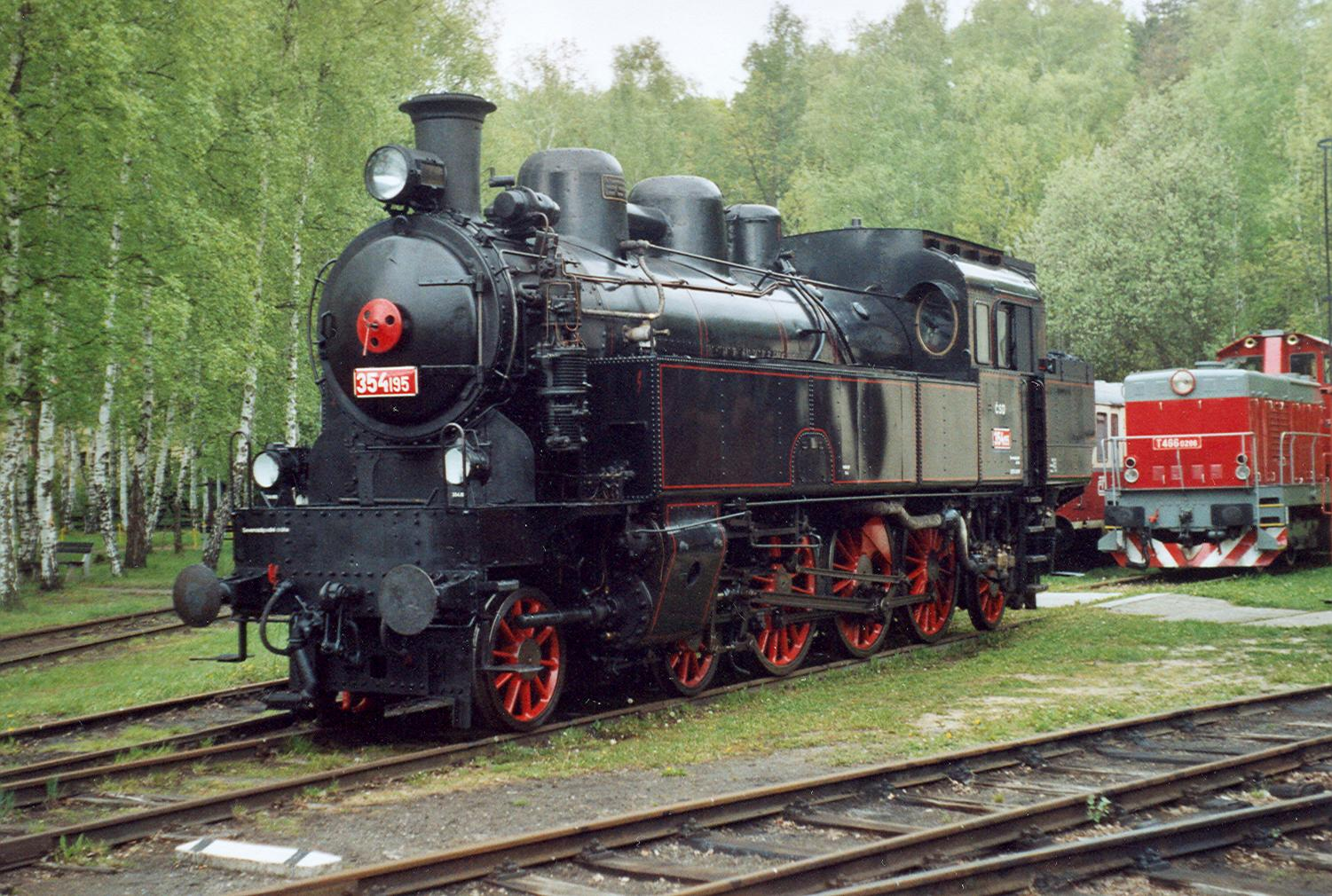
ČSD no. 354.195, a Czechoslovak version of the Austrian class 629

The only Pacific type to be built in Austria was the class 629 4-6-2 tank locomotive of the Imperial Royal Austrian State Railways (kkStB), later the Österreichische Bundesbahnen (ÖBB), of which 95 were built between 1913 and 1927. This highly successful locomotive remained in service until 1975.

The class 629 was later also produced and developed in Czechoslovakia as the class 354.1 of the Czechoslovak State Railways (ČSD). Between 1921 and 1941, 219 of these locomotives were built there and, in addition, seventeen of the original Austrian class 629 locomotives were used there. They survived in service until 1978. Three examples have been preserved. (Also see Czechoslovakia)

The Pacific tender locomotives that worked passenger services in Austria between 1938 and 1945 all belonged to the railways of other countries, such as the Deutsche Reichsbahn, the Czechoslovak State Railways and the Yugoslav State Railways.

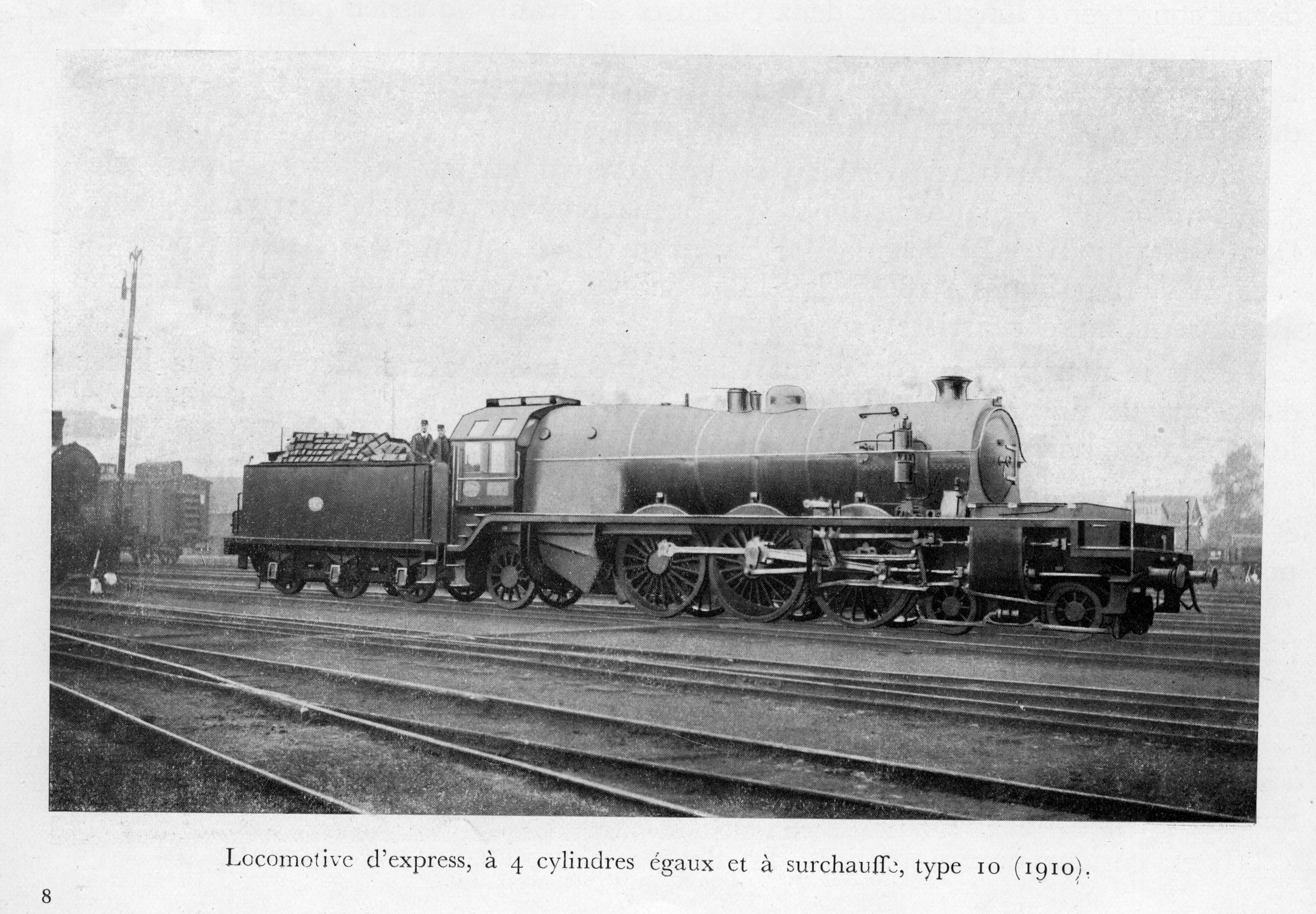
Belgian State Railways unrebuilt type 10.

=== Belgium ===
In 1897, a Type 4 Prairie tender locomotive, built in the 1880s, was fitted with a front bogie, making it the first Belgian Pacific. This rebuilt was not extended to the other 90 Type 4.

Apart from several Pacifics built for foreign railways by Belgian locomotive builders, only two "true" Pacific classes were built for Belgian railways (Belgian State Railways, later SNCB).

- The type 10 was a heavy 4-6-2 built between 1910 and 1912 and radically improved between the 1920s and the 1930s. These 59 engines were used on several main lines; they were the best passenger engines on the challenging Luxembourg line until the line was electrified in 1956;
- The type 1, built in 1935 (15 engines) and 1938 (20), were more modern and had a much wider firebox. They were mostly used on medium inclines and easier lines. They ran until 1962.

=== Bulgaria ===
The Bulgarian State Railways (BDZ) bought its first four-cylinder simple expansion Pacific type locomotive from John Cockerill of Belgium in 1912. This lone engine hauled express trains from Sofia to Svilengrad and was rebuilt in 1933.

In 1938, BDZ improved its express service between Sofia and Burgas and placed an order with Krupp in Germany for five three-cylinder Pacific type locomotives. Because of the disruption caused by World War II, the locomotives were only delivered to Bulgaria in 1941. They had 470-by-660-millimetre (19 in × 26 in) cylinders, 1,850-millimetre (73 in) coupled wheels and were capable of a maximum speed of 120 kilometres per hour (75 miles per hour). They were initially designated class 07.01 to 07.05, but in 1942 their classification was changed to 05.01 to 05.05. They all survived until the end of steam traction in Bulgaria in the 1980s. Engine no. 05.01 has since been restored and, as of 2015, was in working order.

=== Burma ===
Burma was administered as a province of British India from 1886 until 1937. In 1932, the Vulcan Foundry built three 4-6-2 locomotives of the YC class for the 1,000 mm (3 ft 3 3/8 in) metre gauge Burma Railways. Since most of Burma's locomotive stock was destroyed during the Japanese occupation of Burma in the World War II, Vulcan Foundry delivered sixty Pacific locomotives of the YB class in 1947, after the war.

=== Canada ===
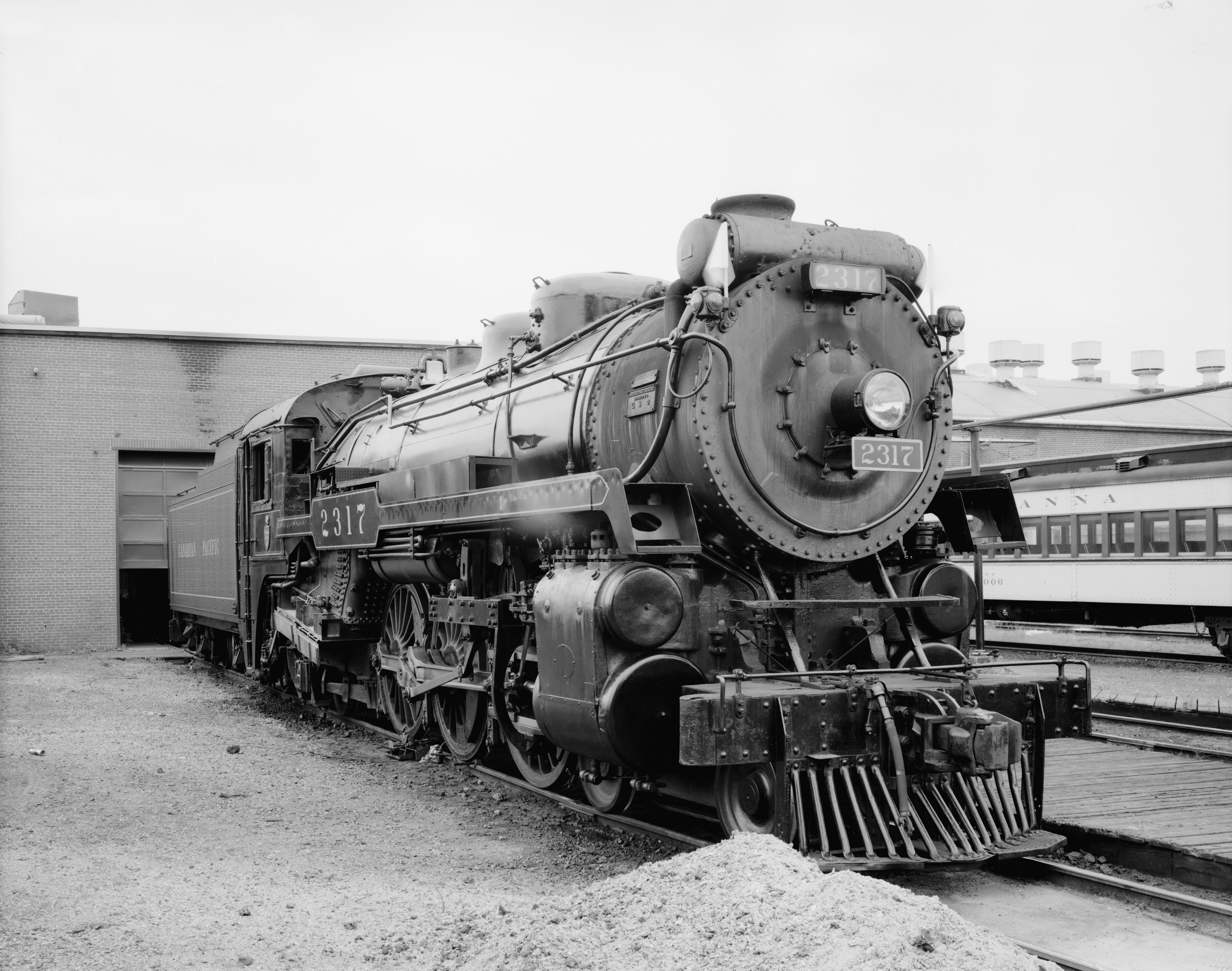
Canadian Pacific G3c class no. 2317

Canadian Pacific (CP) employed several Pacific classes, beginning with 39 G1 class locomotives, built between 1906 and 1914 by the CP at its Angus Shops and by the Montreal Locomotive Works. After 1921, 166 examples of a new G2 class locomotive with a superheater were built by the American Locomotive Company at Schenectady, Angus and Montreal. The last of these remained in service until 1961.

After World War I, the CP needed heavier mixed-traffic locomotives since steel passenger cars replaced the older wooden ones on its mainlines. This resulted in the introduction in 1919 of 23 G3a class 4-6-2s with 75-inch (1,900 mm) driving wheels, built by Angus for service over flat terrain, and five G4 class locomotives with smaller 70-inch (1,780 mm) drivers, built by Montreal for hilly terrain. A further 152 G3 class locomotives were built in batches between 1926 and 1948. These locomotives were withdrawn from service between 1954 and 1965.

102 examples of the G5 class locomotive were built after 1944. The first two were built by Angus and the rest by Montreal and the Canadian Locomotive Company. They were considered fast, efficient and handsome locomotives and remained in service on many secondary lines of the CP until the end of steam.

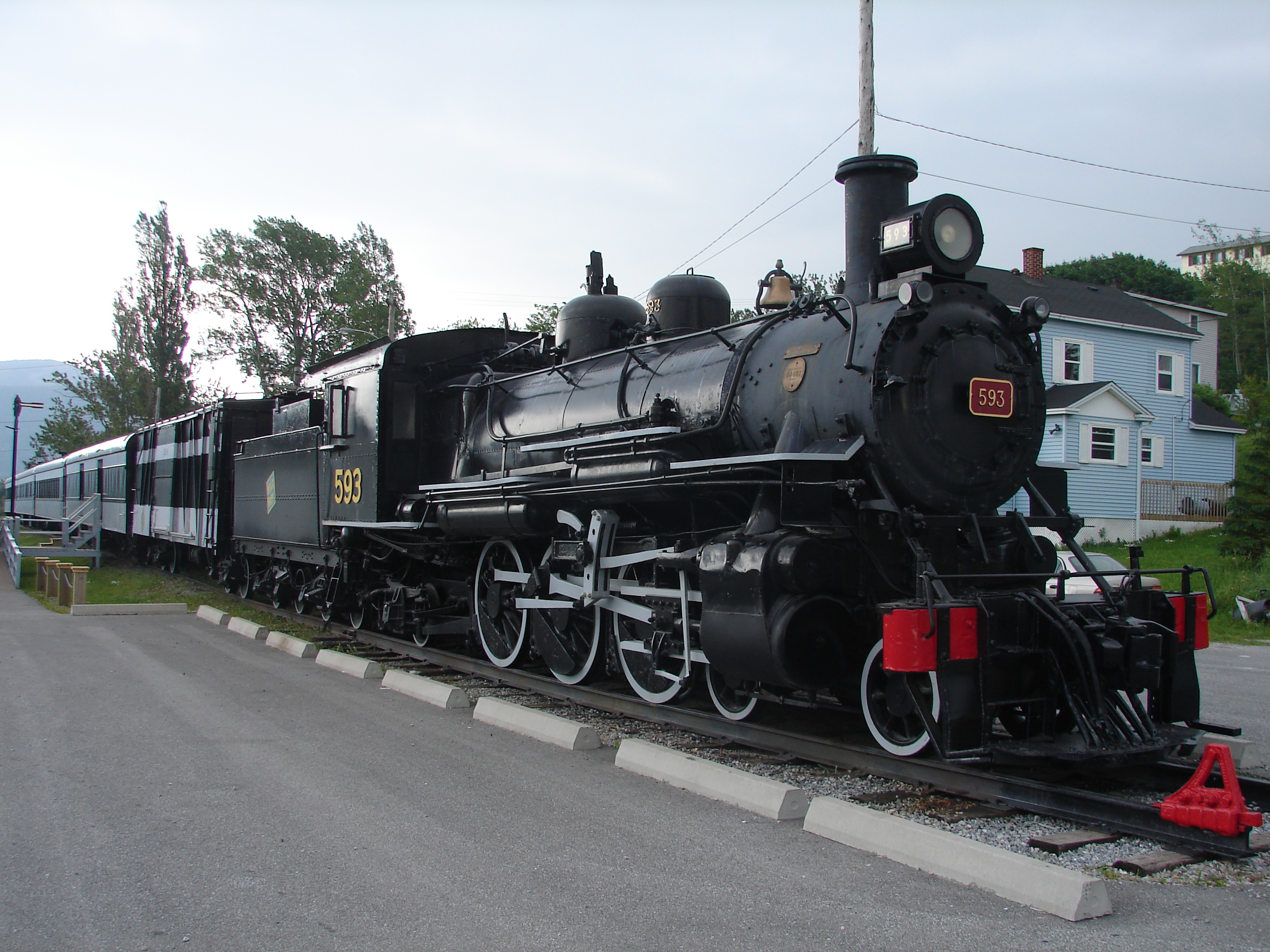
Canadian National's Pacific no. 593

The Reid-Newfoundland Company Limited, which operated the railways in Newfoundland, took delivery of ten Pacific locomotives with 42-inch (1,070 mm) drivers between 1920 and 1929, built by Baldwin, Montreal and ALCO Schenectady. Numbered 190 to 199, they had two 18-by-24-inch (460 mm × 610 mm) cylinders and weighed 56.3 tons. They all passed to the Government-owned Newfoundland Railway, and then to Canadian National (CN) when Newfoundland joined the Confederation of Canada. CN renumbered them 591 to 599 and classified them as J-8-a (BLW 54398–54401 and 54466–54467 of 1920), J-8-b (BLW 59531 and MLW 67129, both of 1926) and J-8-c (ALCO-Schenectady 67941–67942 of 1929).

They were the only Pacific-type locomotives built to operate on 3 ft 6 in (1,067 mm) gauge in North America. The only surviving Newfoundland steam locomotive, the Newfoundland Railway no. 193, later CN no. 593, is preserved and on display at the Humbermouth Historic Train Site in Newfoundland. (Also see § Mexico)

=== China ===
The Japanese introduced several classes of Pacific locomotive during their occupation of Manchuria, but the Pashiro became the standard and was China's most numerous class of steam passenger locomotive. Between 1933 and 1944, around 272 were built for the South Manchuria Railway (SMR), the Manchurian National Railway and the railways of occupied North China. They were built by various Japanese builders, including Dalian and Sifang, while the SMR's own workshops were also involved in the construction.

The Japanese-built Pashina locomotives were used on the Asia Express train between 1934 and 1943, during Japanese control of the SMR. These were built by Kawasaki and Dalian.

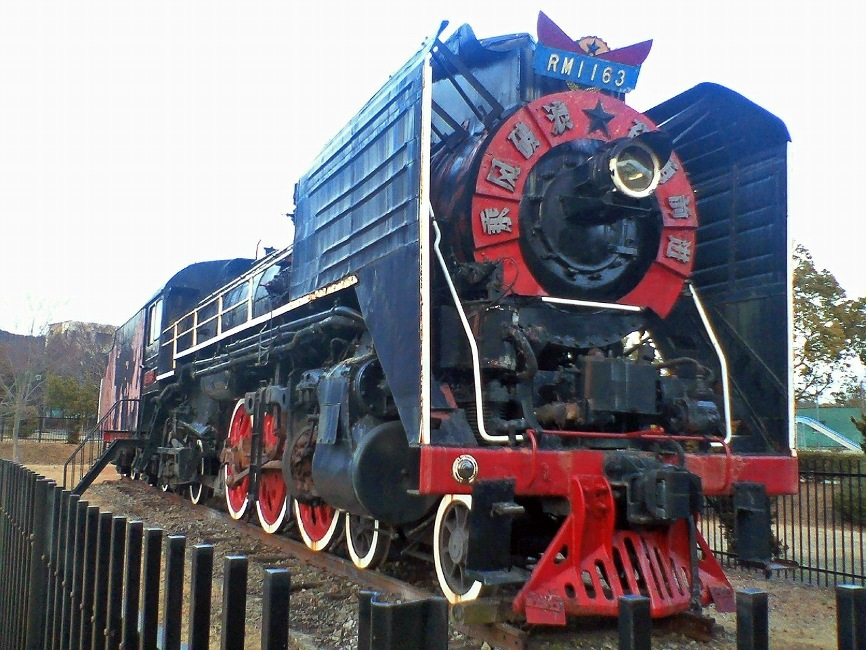
China Railway RM Class No. 1163 at Central Park, Aioi, Hyogo, just before scrapping.

The name Shengli (Victory) was used for all classes of Pacific inherited by the new China in 1951. The Pashiro became the Shengli 6 (SL6 class), while the Pashina locomotives were designated Shengli 7 (SL7 class) under Chinese ownership.

The Sifang works resumed production of SL6 class locomotives in 1956 and completed 151 locomotives before moving on to RM class construction in 1958. The inability of the class to haul the heavier passenger trains that were introduced in the 1970s and 1980s, saw them progressively being re-allocated to secondary duties. By 1990, most of the survivors were concentrated in Manchuria at the Dashiqiao, Jilin and Baicheng depots.

The China Railways RM was China's last steam passenger design. It was a late 1950s development of the successful pre-war SL6 class Pacific and became the standard passenger class. The class, numbered RM 1001 to 1258, entered service in 1958 and a total of 258 were built before production ceased in 1966. In the 1970s, they were gradually displaced from premier services by locomotives more suited to handling heavier trains and they ended their service lives on secondary passenger duties.

=== Czechoslovakia ===
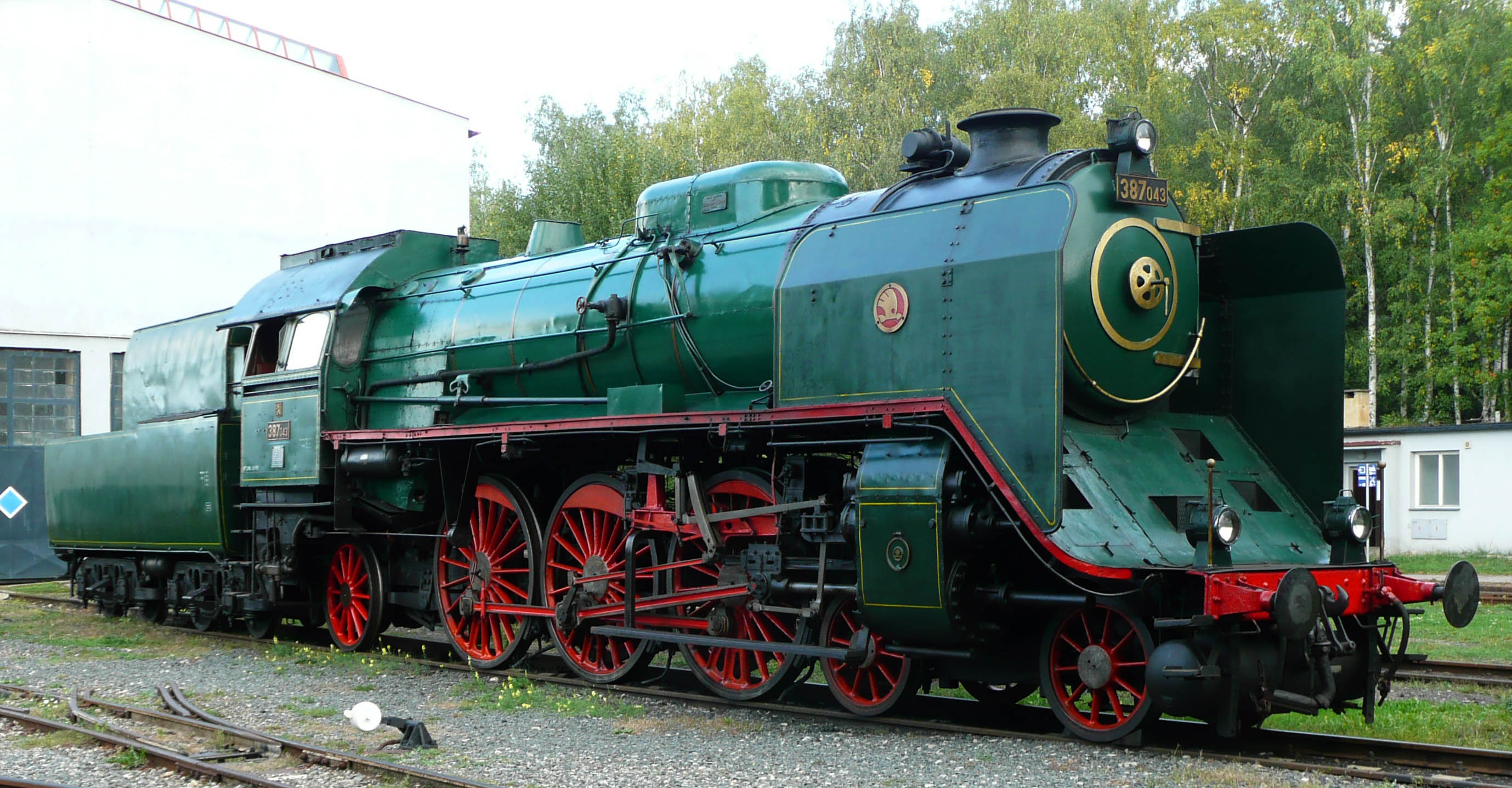
Czechoslovak 387.043 at the České dráhy Museum

Between 1926 and 1967, two Pacific tender locomotive classes were built in Czechoslovakia and operated by the Czechoslovak State Railways (Československé státní dráhy or ČSD). These were the ČSD Class 387.0 and Class 399.0 express passenger locomotives.

The 2100 horsepower Pacific Class 387.0 was the most successful of these, nicknamed Mikádo because of its short chimney. Between 1926 and 1937, 43 were built in five series by the Škoda Works in Plzeň, intended for the heaviest long-distance express trains. This class is considered to have been among the most successful locomotives in Europe. The locomotives began to be withdrawn in 1967, with the last one being retired in 1974. One locomotive, no. 387.043, has been preserved. (Also see Austria)

=== Egypt ===
Prior to 1954, the Egyptian State Railways used 4-4-2 Atlantic or 4-6-0 Ten-wheeler types on express passenger trains. However, in 1953 a requirement arose for a locomotive capable of hauling 550-tonne trains over the 150 kilometres (93 miles) from Cairo to Alexandria in two hours. These were originally going to be 4-6-4 Hudson locomotives, but the specification was eased to suit a 500-tonne train load, allowing a 4-6-2 type to be used.

They were ordered from Société Alsacienne (SACM) at Grafenstaden in France. The class was unusual in being designed for oil burning, with a long narrow firebox and combustion chamber fitted between the plate frames. They had a short lifespan in express train service, since the 1956 war put an end to fast train running in Egypt. The Pacifics were then transferred to haul slower night express trains to Luxor and Aswan. Some remained in service up to 1967.

=== Ethiopia ===
The French-owned Imperial Railway Company of Ethiopia, with 784 kilometres (487 miles) of 1,000 mm (3 ft 3 3/8 in) metre gauge trackage, had four Pacific type locomotives on its roster.

The first one was bought from Forges, Usines et Fonderies de Haine-Saint-Pierre in Belgium in 1923. This locomotive had been ordered by the Spanish railway Ferrocarril Madrid-Aragon in 1914, prior to the outbreak of the World War I, but it was never delivered for reasons unknown. The locomotive used saturated steam and had 1,250-millimetre-diameter (49 in) coupled wheels, which made it well suited to run the 473 kilometres (294 miles) between Addis Abeba and Dire Dawa in Ethiopia. (Also see Spain)

Three more similar Pacific locomotives, but superheated, were ordered in 1936. They arrived after the Italian conquest of Ethiopia and were allocated to the Addis Abeba and Dire Dawa sheds. They continued to haul passenger trains until the mainline diesels arrived in 1956, after which all were soon withdrawn from service and scrapped in the early 1960s.

=== Finland ===
Twenty-two Pacific locomotives of the Class Hr1, numbers 1000 to 1021 and named Ukko-Pekka after the nickname of Finnish President Pehr Evind Svinhufvud, were constructed in Finland by Tampella and Lokomo between 1937 and 1957. They were the largest passenger locomotives to be built and used in Finland and remained the primary locomotives on express trains for Southern Finland until 1963, when the Hr12 class diesel locomotives took over.

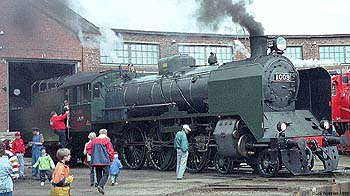
A Finnish "Ukko-Pekka" class Hr1

The last two Class Hr1 locomotives to be built in 1957, numbers 1020 and 1021, Lokomo works numbers 474 and 475, were equipped throughout with SKF C-type roller bearings, even on the coupled rod big ends, and represented a fine combination of American and German locomotive building practices. They were, along with the Deutsche Bundesbahn class 10, the last new-built Pacific type locomotives in Europe.

When tested after delivery from Lokomo or Tampella, each locomotive reached 140 kilometres per hour (87 miles per hour), but in everyday service their speed was limited to 110 kilometres per hour (68 miles per hour). All the locomotives were initially located at Pasila depot in Helsinki, but in 1959 the last seven to be built were transferred to Kouvola depot.

By European standards, Class Hr1 locomotives ran high annual kilometre figures, between 125,000 and 140,000 kilometres (78,000 and 87,000 miles) per locomotive per year between 1937 and 1963. The two fully roller bearing-equipped locomotives even exceeded the 150,000-kilometre (93,000 mi) mark in 1961, the highest annual kilometre figure to be obtained by a steam locomotive in Northern Europe. The only similar annual kilometres by European Pacific type locomotives were run in Germany and by the roller bearing-equipped Peppercorn Class A1 locomotives of the London and North Eastern Railway in the United Kingdom.

At least twelve class Hr1 locomotives were preserved as at April 2008, of which two were in operational condition. These were no. 1021, owned by the VR Group, and the privately owned no. 1009. No. 1001 was reserved for the Railway Museum in Hyvinkää and no. 1002 was reserved for the city of Helsinki as a possible static monument.

=== France ===
France was a major user of the 4-6-2 Pacific type. Following the introduction of two successful Paris à Orléans prototypes in 1907, 1,362 further Pacific locomotives were built for or acquired by the major French railway companies, including those acquired from Germany following the terms of the Armistice in 1918.

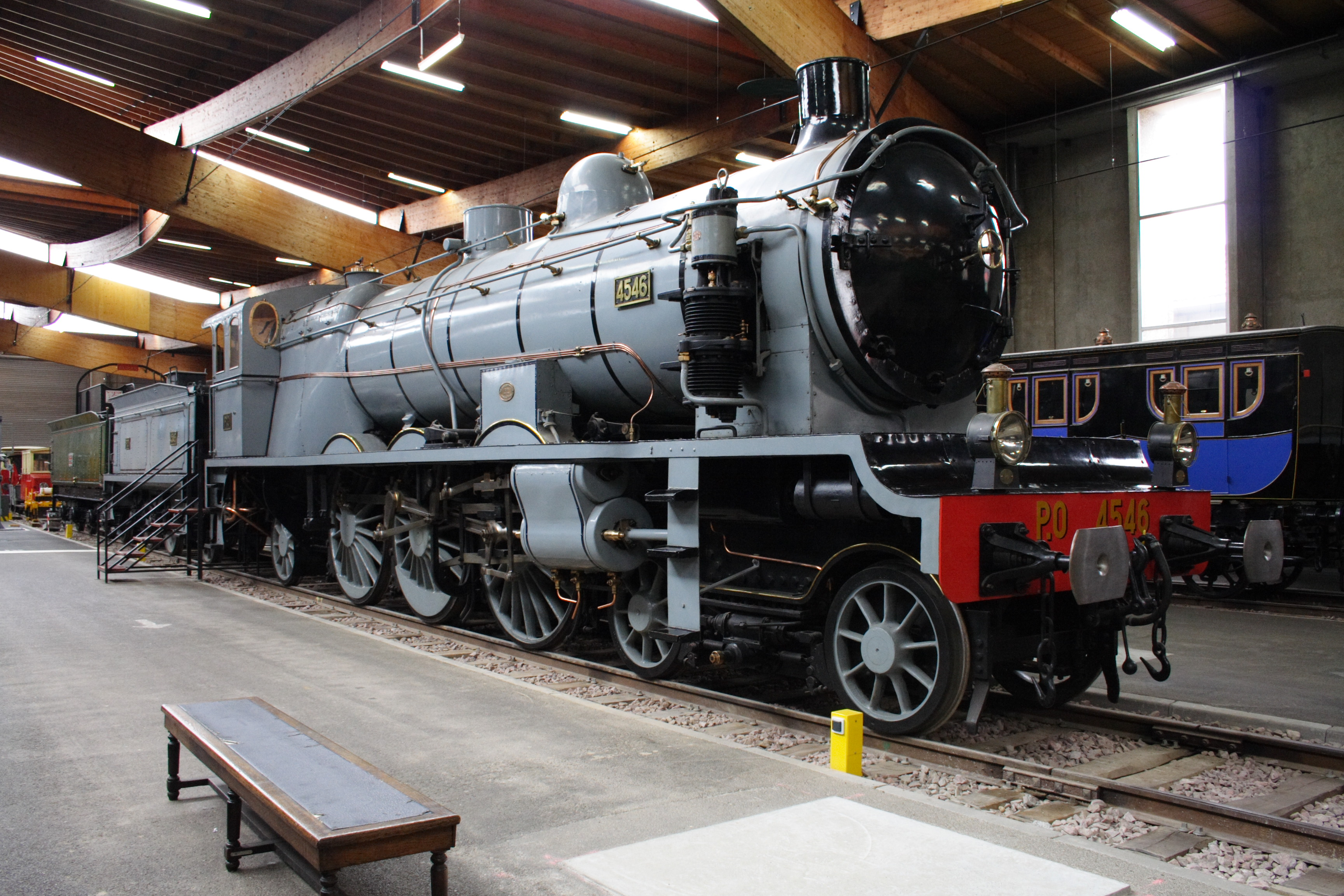
Paris à Orléans 4546 at the Cité du train at Mulhouse

The Paris à Orléans ordered 98 further Pacific locomotives that were delivered between 1908 and 1910, and another 89 in 1909 and 1910. Another fifty were ordered from the American Locomotive Company in 1921 and forty of the type TP-État were bought in 1923. The company was particularly famous for the Chapelon Pacifics of 1929 to 1932.

L'Ouest followed with two prototype 4-6-2 locomotives in 1908, but did not continue with the Pacific type.

The Alsace-Lorraine built eight Pacific locomotives in 1909, at the time when the railway was still under German control. These became French locomotives in 1920.

The Paris à Lyon et à la Méditerranée (PLM) was the largest French user of Pacific locomotives, owning 462, built between 1909 and 1932. These were both compound and simple locomotives and were built both with and without superheaters. Large numbers were later rebuilt to compounds or to incorporate superheaters by both the PLM and the state-owned SNCF.

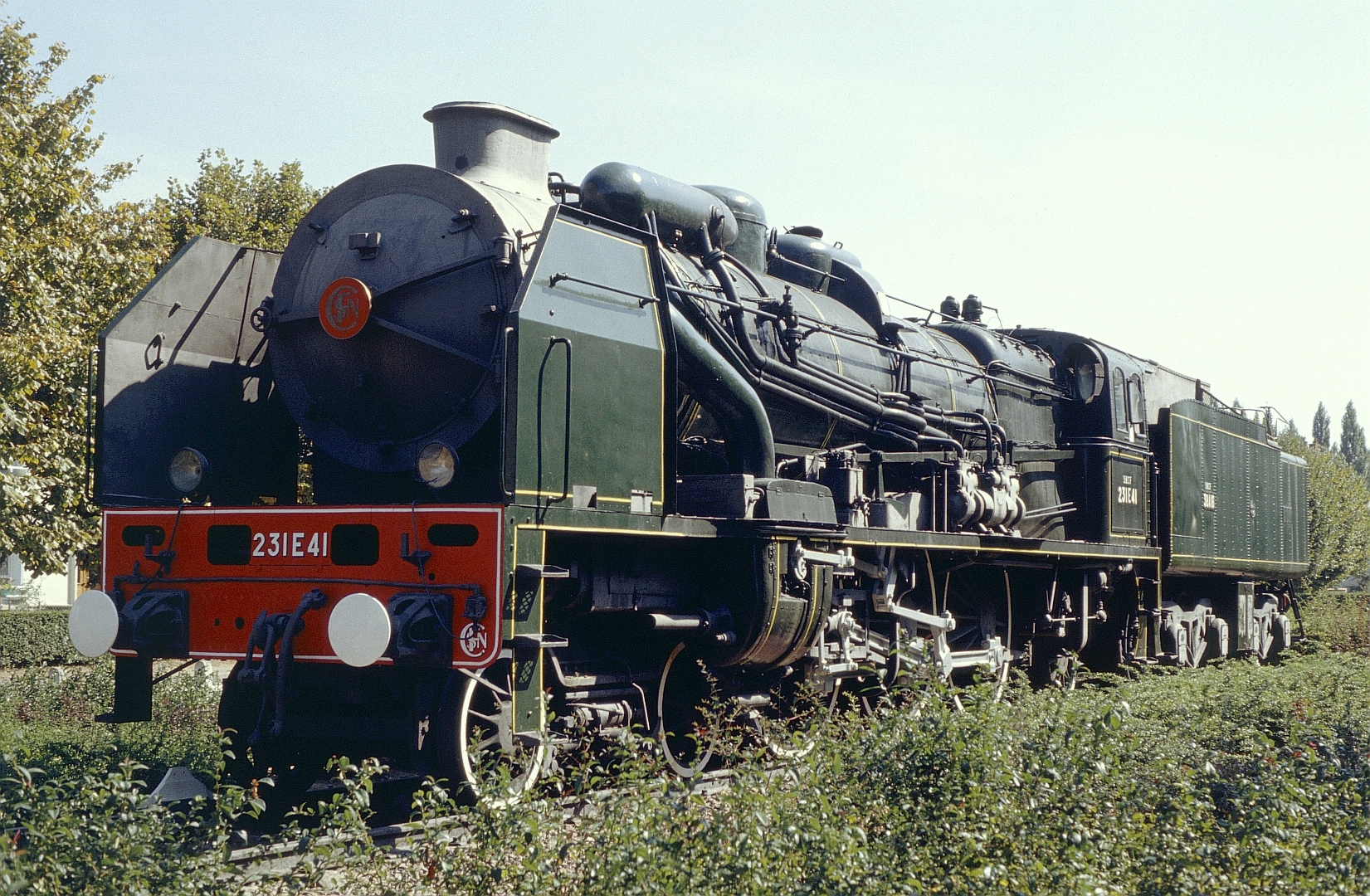
Nord E 41 at Saint-Pierre-des-Corps station

The Nord built 139 Pacific locomotives from 1912, including the various so-called Superpacific types of 1923 to 1931. The company also ordered Chapelon-type rebuilds from the Paris à Orléans in 1934, and new-built locomotives between 1936 and 1938.

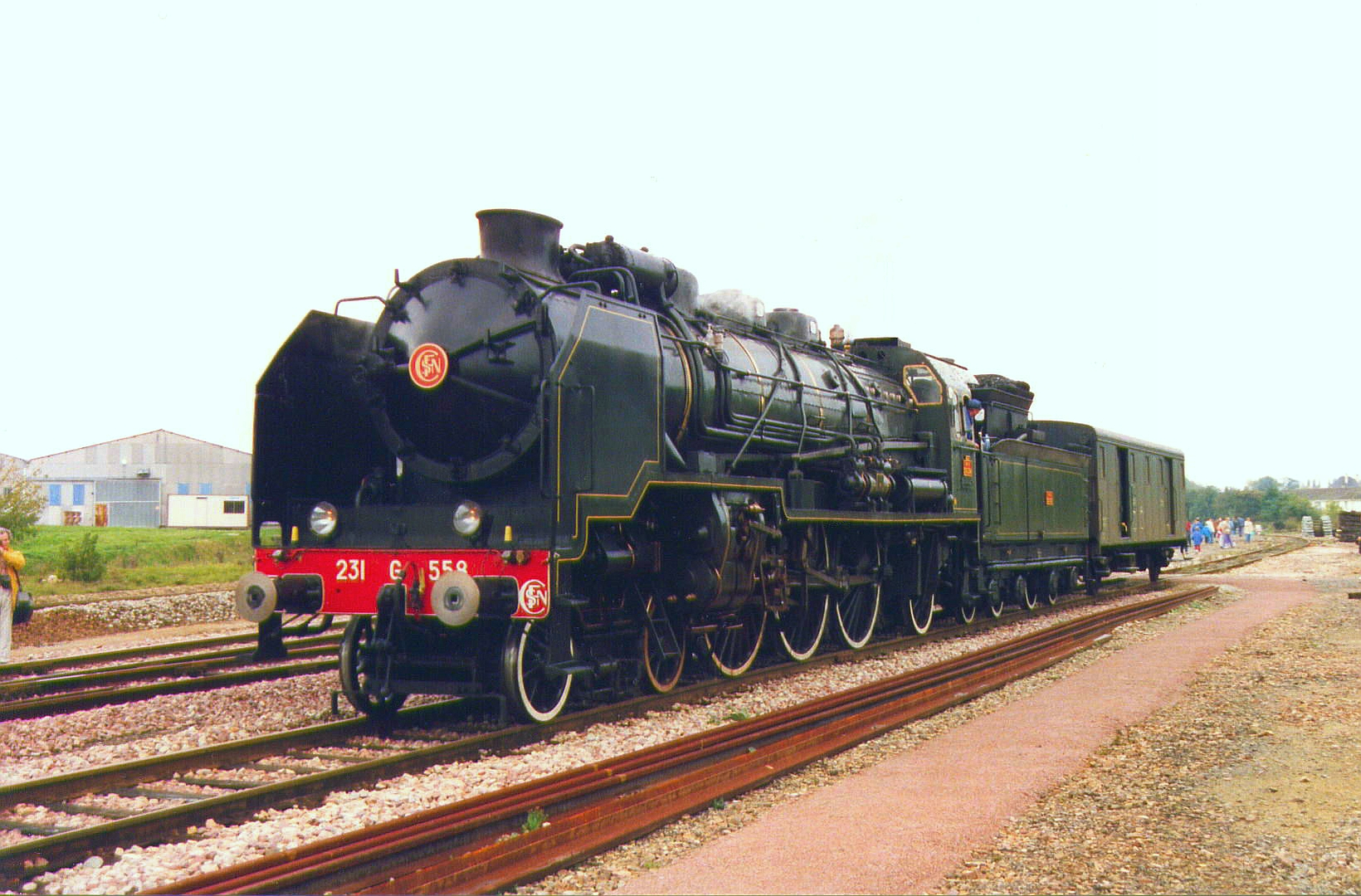
L'État 231 G Ouest No. 558, preserved by the Pacific Vapeur Club

L'État owned 352 Pacific locomotives, some of which were transferred from the Bavarian Railways and Württemberg Railways as Armistice reparations in 1918.

The Midi likewise owned altogether forty Pacific locomotives, acquired in three batches.

The eastern L'Est never built a 4-6-2, preferring its 4-6-0 ten-wheeler types until it progressed straight to the much larger 4-8-2 Mountain type. L'Est nevertheless bought Pacific locomotives to the designs of other companies, including forty TP-État-type class 11 s locomotives between 1921 and 1923, and twelve class 12 s Chapelon rebuilds in 1934.

After nationalisation in 1938, the SNCF built no more Pacifics, although it continued to rebuild some of the existing stock running on lines already established by the private railway companies, particularly by continuing to apply the great improvements brought about by the work of André Chapelon.

=== Germany ===
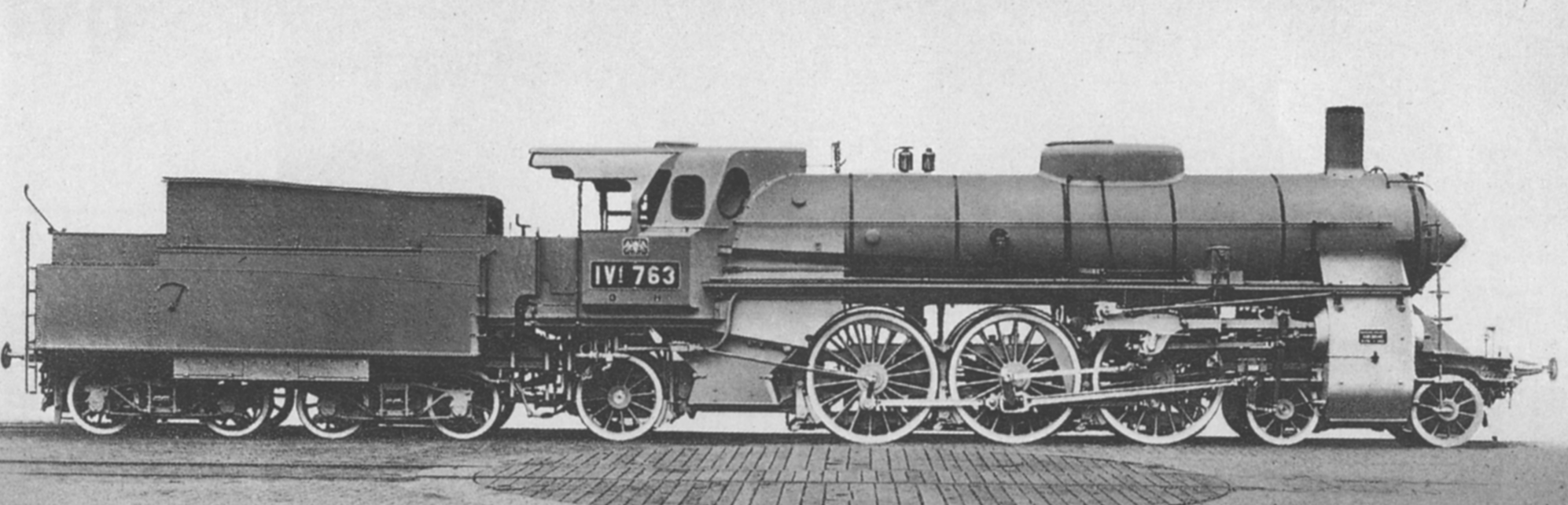
Grand Duchy of Baden State Railways Class IVf

The first Pacific locomotive for a German railway was the Baden IV f class for the Grand Duchy of Baden State Railways (Großherzoglich Badische Staatseisenbahnen, G.Bad.St.E.), designed by Maffei in 1905. However, due to manufacturing delays, the first three locomotives were not introduced until 1907, shortly after the first French Pacifics. They were four-cylinder compound locomotives of the Von Borries type. After the Maffei locomotives, a further 32 were built under license by Maschinenbau-Gesellschaft Karlsruhe and delivered between 1907 and 1913.

While they were successful in the mountainous regions of the G.Bad.St.E., their small driving wheels led to overheating at high speed on level track. Consequently, a new design was created, the Baden IV h, twenty of which were built by Maffei between 1918 and 1920. Most lasted to the end of World War II, with four surviving as test locomotives – three for Deutsche Bundesbahn and one for Deutsche Reichsbahn. Three of these four have survived into preservation.

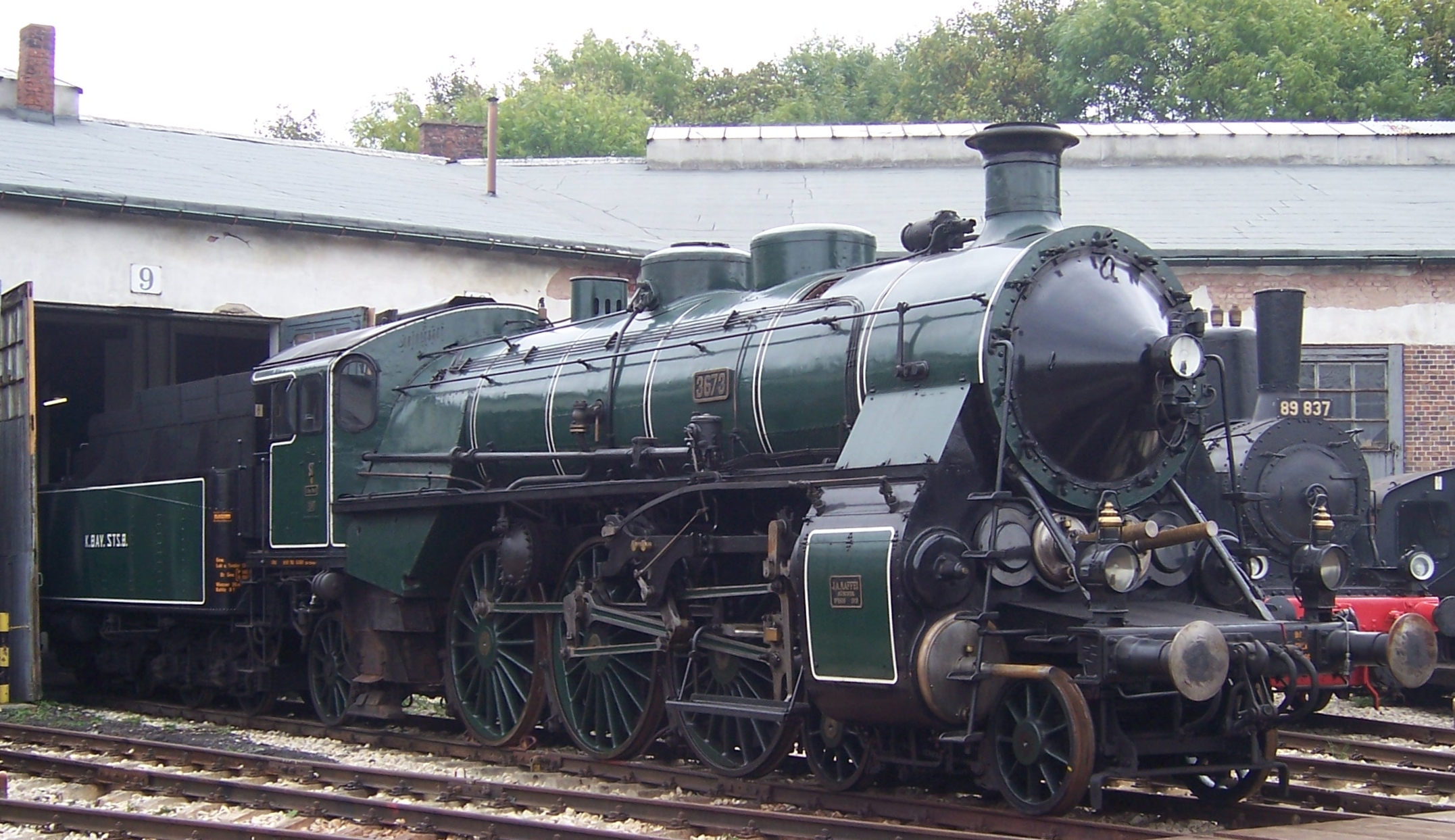
Bavarian S 3/6 class, later Class 18.4-5 of the Deutsche Reichsbahn

However, the most successful early German Pacific class was the Bavarian S 3/6 class of the Royal Bavarian State Railways (Königliche Bayerische Staats-Eisenbahnen), designed by Anton Hammel and Heinrich Leppla of Maffei. This was a larger development of the Baden IV f class, with a four-cylinder compound arrangement. Altogether 159 of them were built between 1908 and 1931, with the last one being retired from ordinary service in 1969.

When the various pre-First World War Pacific locomotives from the different German state railway companies were grouped together by the Deutsche Reichsbahn as the Class 18 with seven sub-classes, the Baden Class IV f became the DRG 18.2 class while the Bavarian S 3/6 class became the DRG 18.4-5 class.

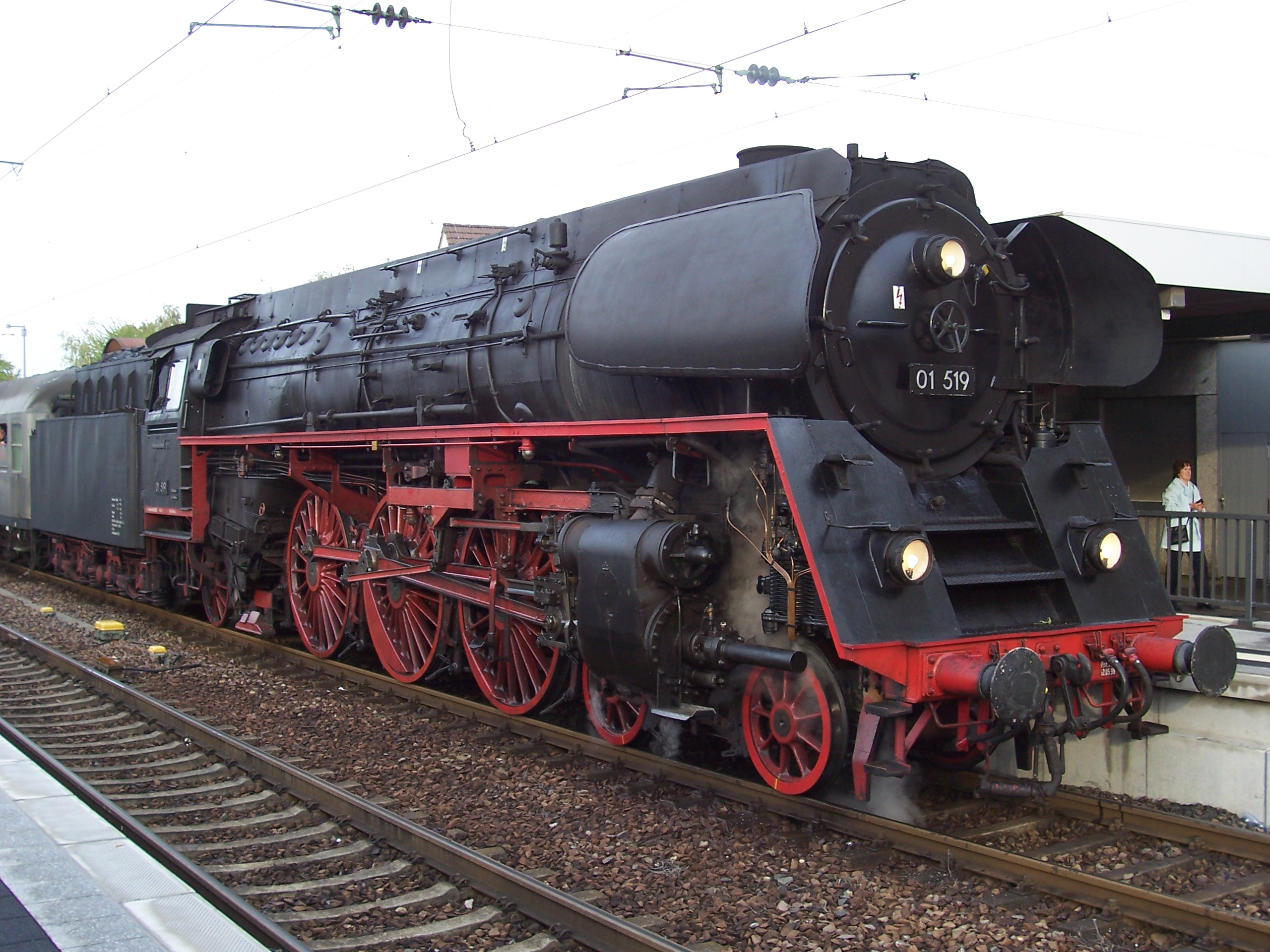
Deutsche Reichsbahn Class 01, rebuilt in the early 1960s, at Schifferstadt

During the 1920s and 1930s the Deutsche Reichsbahn continued to build new Pacific designs, such as the Class 01.10 to Class 03.10 subclasses.

- The Class 01, a two-cylinder standard type of the Deutsche Reichsbahn introduced between 1926 and 1938, was the first standardised steam express passenger locomotive class to be built for the unified German railway system.
- The Class 02 four-cylinder compound locomotive version was less successful, being costly to maintain. Only ten were built and all of them were rebuilt into two-cylinder 01 class locomotives between 1937 and 1942.
- The Class 03 was a lighter version of the 01 class, built between 1930 and 1938. Ten locomotives of the 03.10 class remained in Poland after World War II and were designated the Polish State Railways (PKP) class Pm3. (Also see Poland)

In 1957, only two prototypes of the streamlined Class 10 were built by Krupp for the Deutsche Bundesbahn. They were nicknamed Schwarze Schwäne (Black Swans) and survived until 1968.

=== Hungary ===
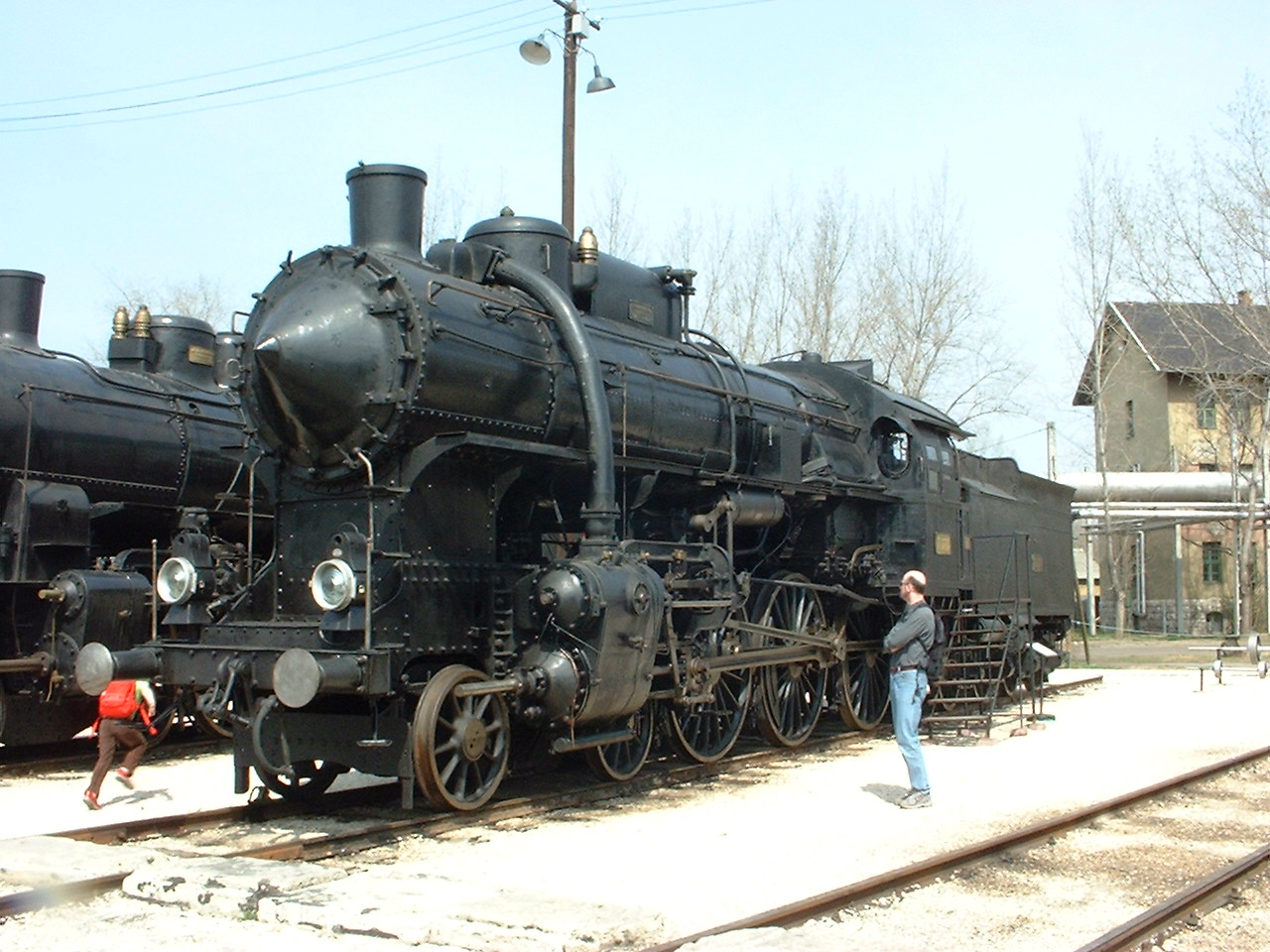
Hungarian 4-6-2 301.016

The Hungarian locomotive builder MÁVAG (Magyar Királyi Államvasutak Gépgyára) built several classes of 4-6-2 locomotives after 1914, both for the Hungarian State Railways (Magyar Államvasutak or MÁV) and for export elsewhere in Europe. MÁV Pacific number 301.016 has been preserved at the Hungarian Railway Heritage Park Museum in Budapest.

=== India ===
The earliest Indian 4-6-2 locomotives were two Class C locomotives, built for the narrow gauge Darjeeling Himalayan Railway by the North British Locomotive Company in 1914. Both were retired in 1976. From the mid-1920s until the 1970s, the Pacific type became very common on both the broad gauge and narrow gauge lines in India.

==== Broad gauge ====
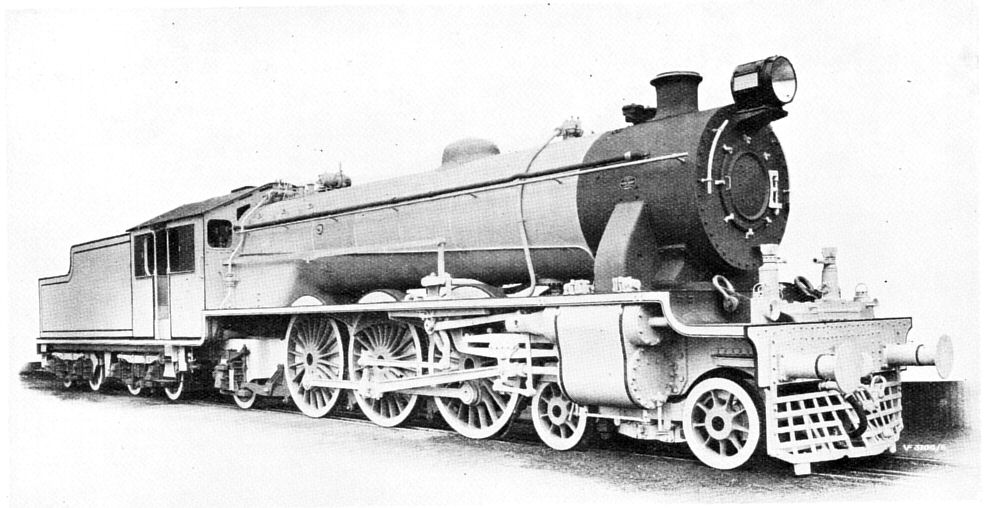
Indian XB class of 1927

In 1924, the Locomotive Standards Committee of the Indian Government recommended eight basic types of locomotive for use on the sub-continent, three of which were 4-6-2s. These were the XA class for branch line passenger working, the XB class for light passenger trains and the XC class for heavy passenger trains. The Vulcan Foundry built large numbers of all these classes for the different Indian railways between the late 1920s and early 1930s, beginning with fourteen each for the East Indian Railway Company (EIR) and the Great Indian Peninsula Railway (GIPR) in 1927.

In 1937, two XP class locomotives were built for the GIPR by Vulcan Foundry. These were experimental locomotives that formed the basis for India's renowned WP class, designed by Railway Board designers in India specifically to use low-calorie, high-ash Indian coal. The WP class was introduced after World War II and remained the most prestigious locomotive of the Indian Railways (IR) until the 1980s. A few reconditioned WP class locomotives were later sold to countries in the Middle East.

There were also two WL classes. The first four locomotives, built in 1939 by Vulcan Foundry for the North Western State Railway, went to Pakistan upon the India-Pakistan partition. A second Indian WL class was introduced in 1955 and ten of these locomotives were built by Vulcan Foundry.

==== Narrow gauge ====
The Bengal Nagpur Railway had a saturated C class, a superheated CS class, and a CC class comprising C class locomotives that had been converted from saturated to superheated steam.

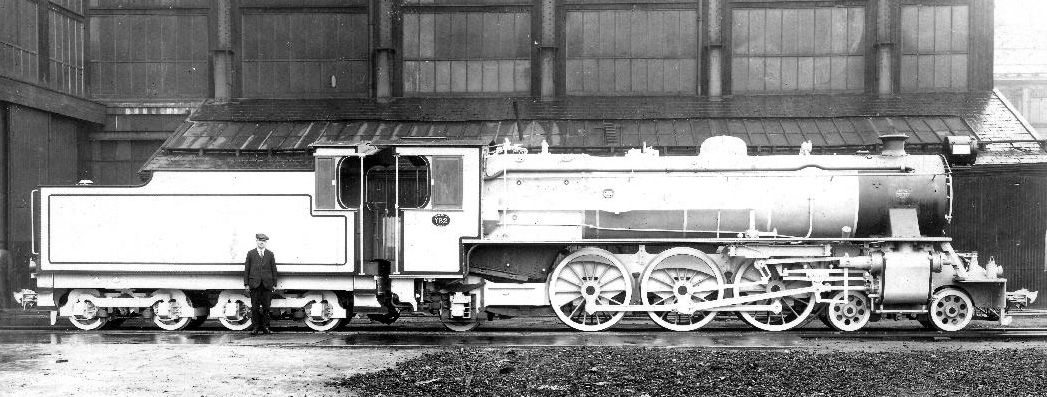
SIR class YB 4-6-2 of 1928

The South India Railway (SIR) ordered six YB class and two XB class Pacific locomotives from the Vulcan Foundry in 1928.

The Mysore State Railway had the E, ES and ES/1 4-6-2 classes.

The Scindia State Railway had a class of eight NM class locomotives, built by W. G. Bagnall in 1931.

The only post-World War II 4-6-2s on narrow gauge Indian Railways were the five ZP class locomotives with six-wheel tenders, built by Nippon Sharyo in Japan in 1954.

=== Indonesia ===
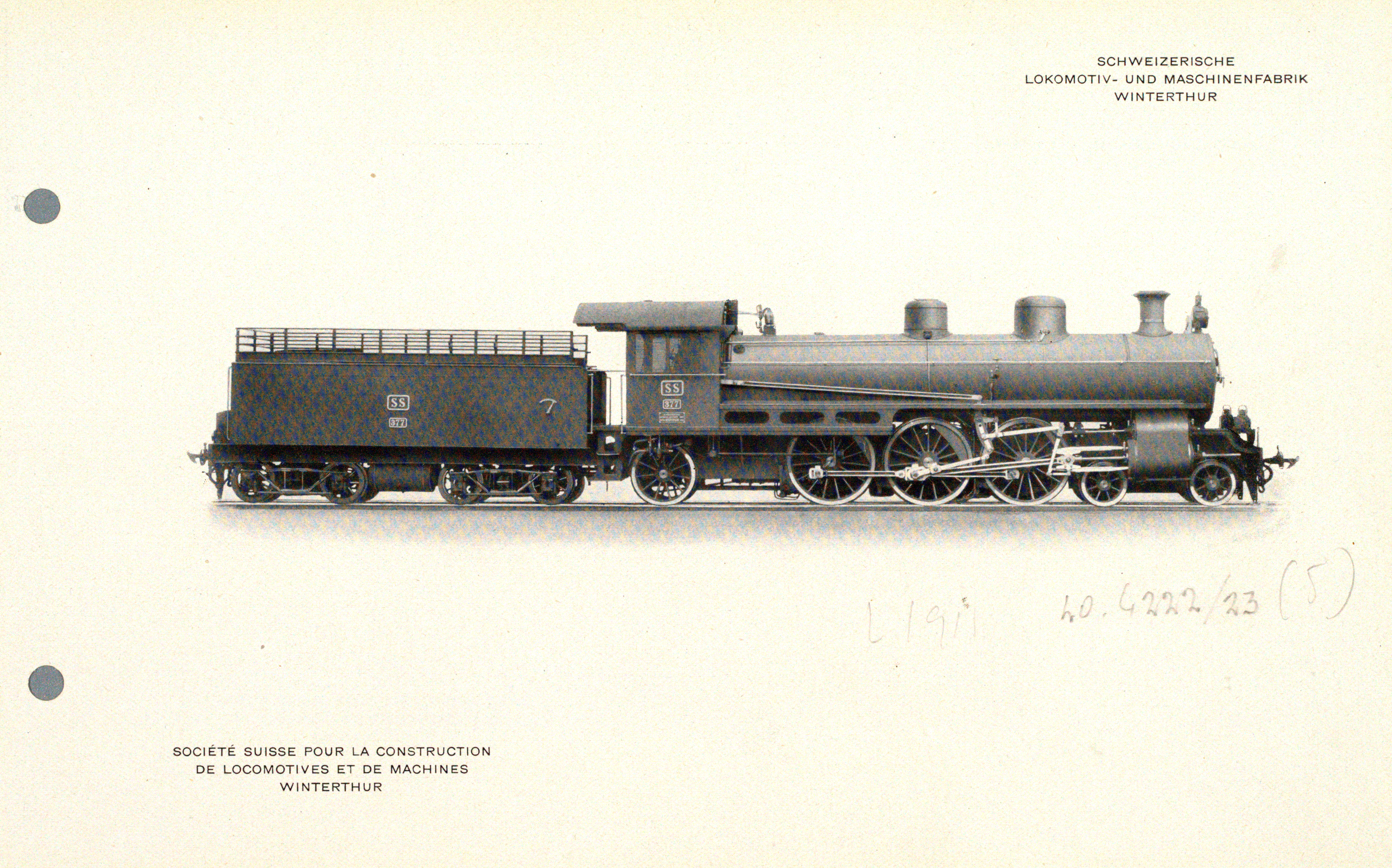
Two-cylinder Pacific of the Staatsspoorwegen of Java (SS Class 700 or DKA C50)

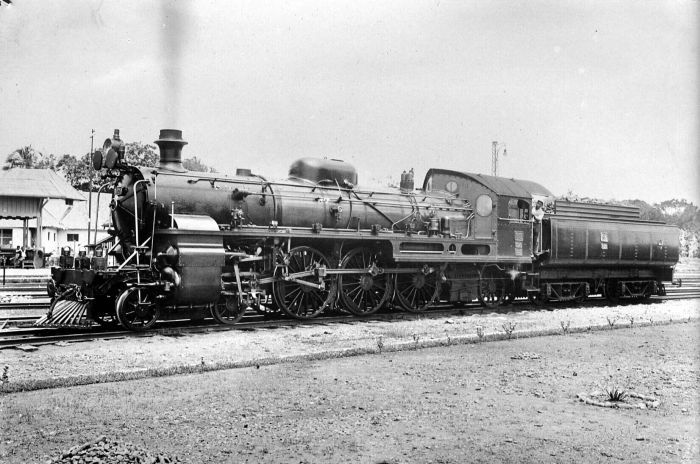
Four-cylinder compound Pacific of the Staatsspoorwegen of Java (SS Class 1000 or DKA C53)

In the early of 20th century, Staatsspoorwegen operated 4-4-0 two-cylinder compound SS Class 600 as express locomotives for mixed freight-passenger traffics in Java. SS imported 44 units of them in 1900–1908 from Hanomag, Hartmann and Werkspoor worked as the workhorse of express trains. In 1908, the line between Cheribon–Kroya had been built which shortened the travel time between Batavia and Surabaya. By the increase in the volume of freight and passenger transports, the SS 600s were felt to be not so fast and sufficient to serve the increasing flow of transports. As a result, SS ordered the new express locomotive to Swiss Locomotive and Machine Works (SLM) and Sächsische Maschinenfabrik (Hartmann) with specifications that it could haul a series of freights in flat-line weighing up to 300 tons and gain a top speed of 80 kilometres per hour (50 miles per hour). They received 11 units of their two-cylinder superheated 4-6-2 from SLM in 1911 and 1912, while the rest of 5 were from Hartmann in 1911 and 1914 and classified as the SS Class 700 (701–716). In a number of locomotive performance tests on the Cikampek-Pegadenbaru line in 1913, another on the Maos-Jogja line in 1914 and on Cikampek-Cheribon line in 1915, these locomotives could reach speeds of more than 120 kilometres per hour (75 miles per hour) and gained world fastest cape gauge locomotive in 1914–1915. SS remarked on the SS Class 700 as engine that had fast and stable performance and soon they were placed in Meester Cornelis, Jogjakarta, Madiun and Surabaya depots. By 1927, SS 701–705 were allocated to South Sumatra division (ZSS) for passenger and freight train transports.

With all the advantages of SS Class 700s followed by the increasing of demands and traffics, the SS was attracted in making their new faster and stronger locomotives. Therefore, they sent a proposal to Dutch engineers and were manufactured in Netherlands by Nederlandsche Fabriek van Werktuigen en Spoorwegmaterieel (Werkspoor). Twenty of new advanced 4-6-2 locomotives arrived in 1920–1922 and classified as SS 1000 class (1001–1020) with a driver's cabin design that tapered to forward giving the impression of grace and speed, in addition of 4-6-2 wheel arrangement supplemented with four compound cylinders and superheater was expected to provide the faster, more stability and fuel efficiency that required to haul express trains, but this was not achieved. At the first of the performance test, the locomotive had shown poor performance especially when driven at speeds over 90 kilometres per hour (55 miles per hour). There some complaints that the SS Class 1000 locomotives were oscillated showed by record that the stoker couldn't put a shovel of coal into firebox due to hard shaking when driven at speeds above 100 kilometres per hour (67 miles per hour), while excessive wear on the third driving wheels and there was design error in manufacturing which led to maintenance difficulties (in other records, they had a design flaw at the trailing wheels causing instability). However, SS still preserved it as the main engine hauling express trains with high maintenance costs. SS also recalled the SS 700s along with the 4-6-4T SS 1300s to haul express trains by bringing back their achievements on speed and stability. Ironically, the myriad achievements of the SS Class 700 were overshadowed by SS Class 1000 when worked to haul the Eendaagsche and Java Nacht express trains by 1929 and mid 1930s.

After Japanese occupation and Indonesian Independence, both locomotives renumbered as C50 and C53. The majority of the class had been scrapped after independence (around 1960-70s). It could be said the C50 classes were the extinct class of express locomotives due to lack of documentations and they were scrapped when the last 2 of them were still operating in Tanjungkarang around 1970s. The last survivor of C53 was number 17, which lasted until the final days of steam locomotives in Indonesia. During its last days in service before retirement, it was used to haul local passenger trains between Bangil and Surabaya Kota and now preserved as static display at the Transportation Museum of Taman Mini Indonesia Indah.

=== Iraq ===
When the 4 ft 8 1/2 in (1,435 mm) standard gauge Baghdad Railway was nearing completion between Mosul and the town of Tel Kotchek on the border with Syria, the Iraqi State Railways ordered four streamlined Pacific locomotives from Robert Stephenson & Hawthorns in the United Kingdom, to haul the international Taurus Express between Istanbul in Turkey and Baghdad in Iraq on the Iraqi stage of its journey.

Three were delivered in 1941 and designated the PC class, but the fourth was lost en route. When the Iraqi standard gauge railways were dieselised in the 1960s, the class was withdrawn from service.

=== Italy ===
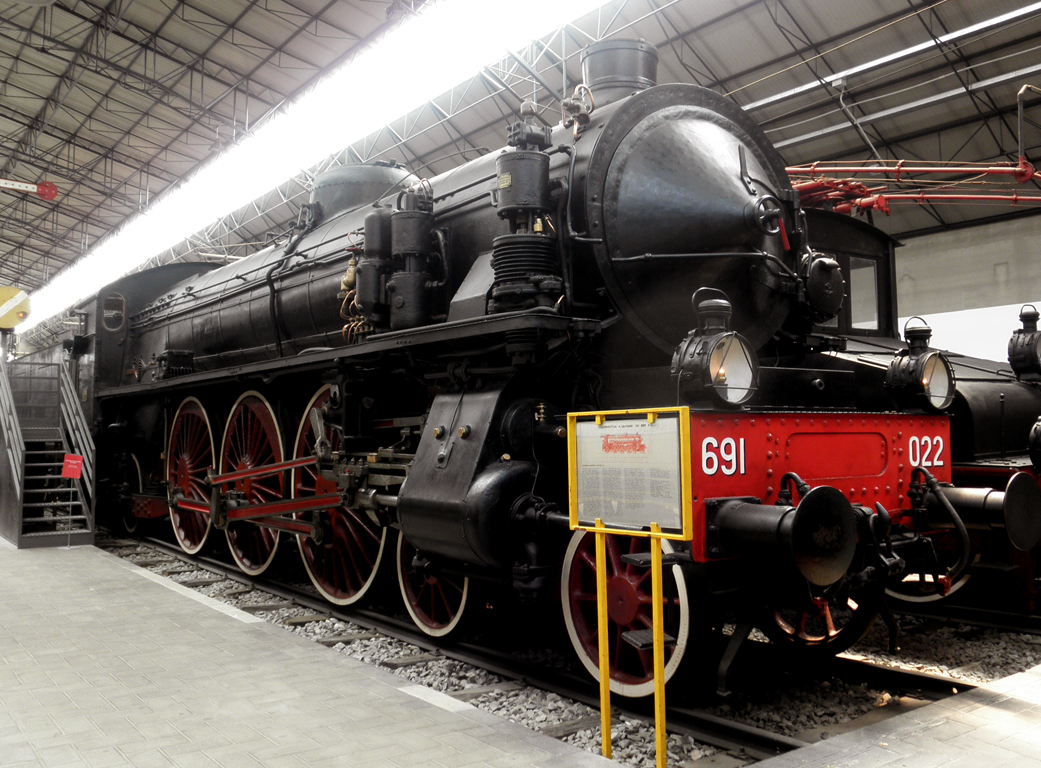
Italian Class 691 no. 022 at Milan

Between 1911 and 1914, 33 Pacific locomotives of the 690 class were built for the Ferrovie dello Stato Italiane (Italian State Railways), twenty by Breda in Milan, ten by Ansaldo in Genoa and three by Officine Meccaniche in Milan.

Between 1928 and 1931, these locomotives were rebuilt with larger boilers and reclassified as Class 691. One of them, no. 691.011, established the Italian speed record for steam locomotives at 150 kilometres per hour (93 miles per hour).

The whole class was withdrawn between 1962 and 1963. One locomotive, no. 691.022, has been preserved at the Museo della Scienza e della Tecnologia di Milano (National Museum of Science and Technology of Milan).

=== Japan ===
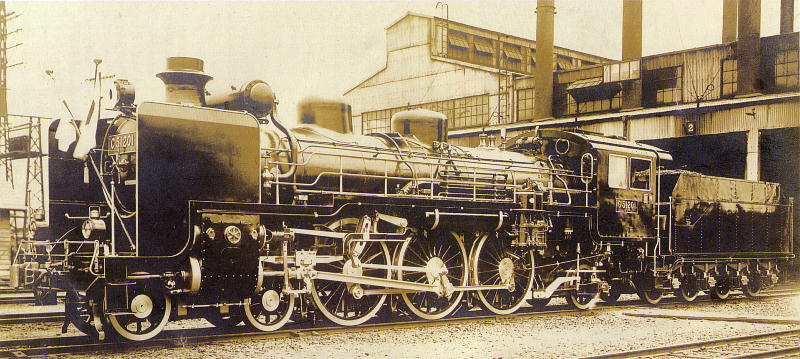
Japanese Government Railways C51 class C51201 on 7 June 1940

The Japanese Government Railways built a number of 4-6-2 designs between 1920 and the 1950s. The most notable was possibly the JNR Class C51, the first Japanese-built high-speed passenger locomotive, used for express services on the Tōkaidō mainline and later on regional trunk lines. Five of these locomotives were built in 1920.

Other Japanese Pacific designs included the C52 class, built from 1926 to 1929, the C53 class, built from 1928 to 1929, the C54 class, built in 1931, the C55 class, the C57 class built from 1937 to 1953, and the C59 class.

The C57 Class, of which 201 were built by Kawasaki, Kisha Seizō, Mitsubishi and Hitachi, was the JNR's last steam locomotive and was used until 1975 to work passenger trains on the Muroran mainline between Iwamizawa and Muroran in Hokkaido.

=== Malawi ===
The 3 ft 6 in (1,067 mm) Cape gauge Nyasaland Railways (the Malawi Railways after independence) obtained six Class F Pacific type locomotives from the British War Department in 1946, to work on the Trans-Zambesi Railway (TZR). The locomotives had been built by the North British Locomotive Company in 1942 and were numbered TZR 25 to 30. All six were still in service on the Malawi Railways in 1973.

=== Malaysia ===
The 1,000 mm (3 ft 3 3/8 in) metre gauge Malayan Railway was amongst the earliest railways in Asia to adopt Pacific type locomotives. Sixty locomotives of the Federated Malay States Railways (FMSR) Class H were built between 1907 and 1914. With a small volume of highly rated freight traffic, it was possible to adopt standard engines for both passenger and freight services. Three coupled axles were sufficient to move the trains at moderate speeds over the whole Malayan rail network.

As a result of experience gained with the first batch of 4-6-2 locomotives, the design of Malayan Pacific locomotives was finalised and 68 engines of this design were eventually built. They had bar frames, steel fireboxes and three cylinders, each of 13 by 24 inches (330 by 610 millimetres). The coupled wheels were 54 inches (1,372 millimetres) in diameter. The heating surface of the boiler was 1,109 square feet (103.0 square metres), of which 218 square feet (20.3 square metres) was superheating surface, while the grate area was 27 square feet (2.5 square metres). The total weight in working order was 60.5 tons, with a maximum axle load of 12.9 tons. Its maximum speed in ordinary service was 50 miles per hour (80 kilometres per hour). The three cylinders were provided with rotary cam poppet valves with the camshaft divided into two parts, independently driven from each side of the engine, which avoided complete immobilisation in case of a breakdown on a long stretch of single track. These locomotives were all later converted to burn oil fuel.

During World War II, after the fall of Singapore, the Japanese Southern Army's Railway Engineering Troops transferred a number of older Malayan Pacific locomotives to operate their 471-kilometre (293 mi) Taimen Rensetsu Tetsudo, the Thailand-Burma Railway. Some Pacifics were not returned to Malaya after the war but remained in Thailand. When the rail connection was established between the Malayan and Thai railways, the Pacifics were a common sight at the head of the Singapore and Bangkok expresses as well as on the other passenger trains in domestic Malayan service.

After the arrival of the mainline diesel-electric locomotives in the latter part of the 1950s, the Pacifics were transferred to less important trains. Many survived up the end of Malayan steam traction in the 1970s.

=== Mexico ===
The Canadian National (CN) sold a 3 ft 6 in (1,067 mm) gauge Pacific locomotive, the former CN no. 591, to Ferrocarriles Nacionales de México, where it was numbered 139. (Also see Canada)

=== Mozambique ===
The Caminhos de Ferro de Lourenço Marques in Portuguese Mozambique ordered its first three class 300 Pacific locomotives from Baldwin in 1919. They hauled passenger trains on the 88-kilometre (55 mi) line between Lourenço Marques (Maputo) and Ressano Garcia, and also crossed the South African border at Komatipoort in South Africa, 93 kilometres (58 miles) from Lourenço Marques, where South African Railways locomotives took over for the rest of the way to Pretoria. Two more locomotives were added in 1923 and a further order for four additional Pacific locomotives was placed with Henschel in 1955, for use on the Beira–Bulawayo railway line.

Henschel also supplied three more modern Pacific type locomotives to Mozambique in 1955. These Henschel Pacifics weighed 73.75 tons in working order while its total weight, tender included, was 128 tons. The firegrate area was 3.8 square metres (41 square feet) and it had 480-by-660-millimetre (19 in × 26 in) cylinders and 1,524-millimetre-diameter (60.0 in) driving wheels. These locomotives were good examples of Pacific type 3 ft 6 in (1,067 mm) Cape gauge passenger locomotives in Southern Africa. When they arrived, their older American-built counterparts were relieved of mainline duty to haul the Lourenço Marques local suburban services. All the Pacifics were allocated to the Lourenço Marques shed for the whole of their service lives and all were still in service in 1971.

=== New Zealand ===
The first true Pacifics, the original thirteen Q class 4-6-2 locomotives built by Baldwin for the New Zealand Railways Department (NZR) in 1901, worked until withdrawal in 1957. None were preserved.

These were followed by 58 Pacific locomotives of the A class, built in 1906 by the NZR's Addington Railway Workshops and by A&G Price. Two of these have been preserved. A further ten locomotives of the A^{A} class were built by Baldwin in 1914.

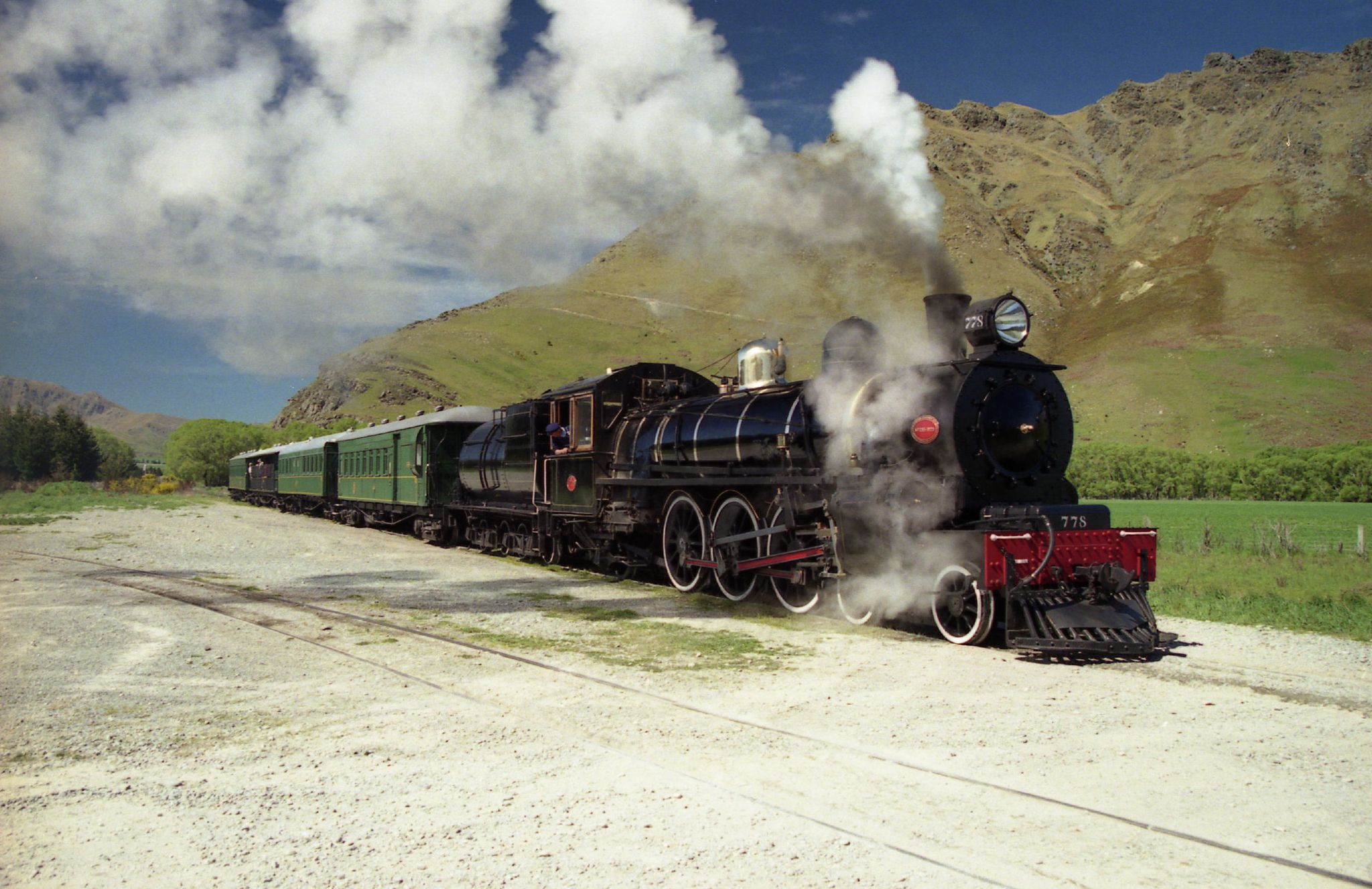
A^{B} class no. 778 on the Kingston Flyer

The most notable 4-6-2 class in New Zealand was the A^{B} class, built between 1915 and 1927 by Addington, Price and the North British Locomotive Company in Scotland. These were reputed to be the first locomotives to generate one horsepower for every 100 pounds (45 kilograms) of weight and eventually became the most numerous class of steam locomotives in New Zealand, with a total of 143 built, and a further 12 rebuilt from WAB class Hudson tank engines. When they were superseded by new locomotives on the principal express and heaviest freight trains during the 1930s, they were used on secondary duties. The A^{B} class locomotives remained in service until 1969, two years before the end of steam locomotive operations in New Zealand. As a result, seven of them have been preserved.

One further 4-6-2 type was the G class. These were six three-cylinder Pacific locomotives that were rebuilt from three unsuccessful G class 4-6-2+2-6-4 Garratt locomotives by NZR's Hillside Workshops in 1937. They were equipped with A^{B} class boilers, new roller bearing trailing trucks, new cabs and Vanderbilt type tenders of similar design to that of the A^{B} class. Like the Garratts they were created from, the rebuilds were not considered successful.

In 1960 Ted Blomfield, locomotive fitter at Rotorua, New Zealand, built a Super Q Pacific for the 1 foot gauge Toot and Whistle Railway. The engine operated at Toot and Whistle's Kuirau park railway for six years before officialdom demanded the locomotive be retired. It was replaced by a Black Five replica. Another Super Q exists as a 5 inch-gauge engine.

=== Nigeria ===
Between 1926 and 1928, the 3 ft 6 in (1,067 mm) gauge Nigerian Railways ordered ten Class 405 Pacifics from Nasmyth, Wilson & Company in Manchester, for express services on the 1,126-kilometre (700 mi) line between Lagos and Kano. They used saturated steam and had 18-by-26-inch (460 mm × 660 mm) outside cylinders and 60-inch-diameter (1,524 mm) driving wheels. All ten were named and they hauled named trains like the North Mail and Boat Express, both averaging only 35 kilometres per hour (22 miles per hour) between stops. They were ousted from principal passenger trains when the first mainline diesel locomotives arrived, but continued working less important secondary train services well into the 1970s.

=== Philippines ===
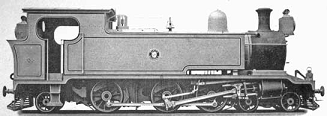
Manila Railway 121 in 1906.

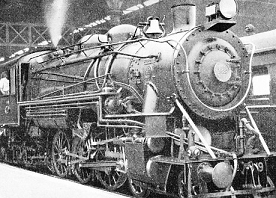
Manila Railroad 148 in 1946.

The Manila Railroad (MRR) operated two classes of this type. Unlike with most rail operators of the time, this was not the most popular wheel arrangement in its mainline steam locomotive fleet as types that had eight driving wheels such as 4-8-2 and 2-8-2 were more successful in the country.

The first were six 120 class 4-6-2T tank units built by the North British Locomotive Company of Glasgow. They were first built in 1906 and entered service in 1908. These were primarily used on various services on what was the PNR North Main Line. As larger tender locomotives built by American firms started entering service in the early 1920s, these were relegated to branch line and switching services. By 1952, only one unit survived and it was scrapped not long after. An expansion of the class was ordered in 1910. However, these two tank locomotives that were numbered 127 and 128, were 4-6-4T Baltic types which entered service in 1917.

The second were ten 140 class locomotives built by Baldwin between 1926 and 1929 as part of the modernization efforts of the MRR to replace its aging British-built tank locomotives throughout its network. These were used on express services on what is now the PNR South Main Line. In 1946, a number of these units were the first to return to service among the agency's prewar fleet. By 1952, only two locomotives were in service. These were removed from service in 1956 and were scrapped in the 1960s.

=== Poland ===
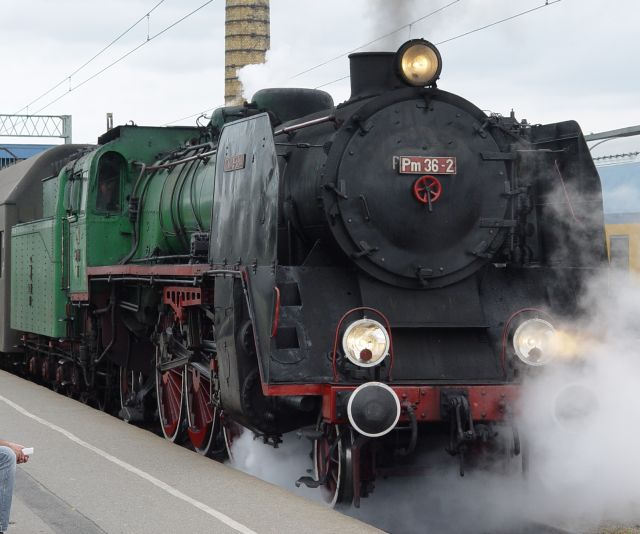
Pm36-2 Beautiful Helene in Poznań

In the Polish State Railways (Polskie Koleje Państwowe or PKP) locomotive classification system, locomotives with a 2C1 (4-6-2 ) axle arrangement were identified with the letter "m" in the class prefix. Express locomotives therefore had a "Pm" prefix, passenger locomotives an "Om" prefix and tank passenger locomotives an "OKm" prefix.

The PKP class Pm36 consisted of two experimental Polish prototype express locomotives, built by Fablok of Chrzanów in 1937. One of them, no. Pm36-1, was streamlined, while the other had a standard appearance in order to compare their respective performances in terms of top speed, acceleration and coal and water consumption.

The Pm36-1 won a gold medal at the International Exposition of Modern Art and Technology in Paris in 1937. It was damaged and later scrapped during World War II, but Pm36-2 survived and worked on the PKP until 1965, when it was given to the Warsaw Railway Museum. In 1995, it was rebuilt and restored to mainline specifications and nicknamed Beautiful Helene. As of 2011, while still remaining museum property, the locomotive was in regular service at Wolsztyn.

Besides these two Polish-built locomotives, several German DRG class 03, class 03^{10} and class 18^{1} locomotives (ex Württemberg Class C) and Austrian class 629 tank locomotives saw service in Poland as the classes Pm2, Pm3, Om101 and OKm11 respectively. (Also see Germany) and (Austria)

One 600 mm (1 ft 11 5/8 in) narrow gauge Pacific locomotive, the Belgijka, built in 1935 by Ateliers Métallurgiques in Nivelles and Tubize in Belgium, was also used in Poland and is preserved at the Narrow Gauge Railway Museum in Wenecja, Poland.

=== Portugal ===
The Portuguese Railways (Caminhos de Ferro Portugueses or CP) had two batches of Pacific 2C1-h2 class locomotives running on its 1,668 mm (5 ft 5 21/32 in) broad gauge lines, built by Henschel & Son in 1924 and 1925. The first batch of ten locomotives, numbered 551 to 560, were used on lines south of the river Tagus, while the second batch of eight, numbered 501 to 508, were built for the Porto line north of the Tagus. Both Pacific classes had deep and narrow fireboxes and the same cylinders, coupled wheels and motion as the 4-6-0 Ten-wheelers of the class CP 351 to 370.

The Pacifics were capable of very fast running. Before World War II, the CP was renowned for the speed of its trains. The track was carefully maintained, laid with 45-kilogram-per-metre (91 lb/yd) rails, and the speed limit of 120 kilometres per hour (75 miles per hour) was frequently reached with steam locomotives.

In normal service, these engines could haul 400 tons behind the tender at 120 kilometres per hour (75 miles per hour) on level track. In 1939, a four-coach train weighing 170 tons and hauled by a Pacific locomotive of the class 501–508, covered the 343 kilometres (213 miles) from Porto to Lisbon-Campolide in 189 minutes, at an average speed of 107.8 kilometres per hour (67 miles per hour), with stops at Papilhosa and Entroncamento. A distance of 100 kilometres (62 miles) of slightly falling, level or slightly rising gradient could be covered at speeds of 140 to 145 kilometres per hour (87 to 90 miles per hour), while station stops lasting less than a minute were frequent.

These locomotives began to be replaced by diesels in the 1960s and disappeared from the scene in the early 1970s. One of the Pacific locomotives, no. 553, is preserved at the Santarém depot museum.

=== Russia/Soviet Union ===
Pacifics were not common in Russia. The only known examples were the four-cylinder L class express passenger locomotives, built by the Putilov Works at Saint Petersburg for the Vladikavkaz Railway in 1914. The chief designer was Vazlav Lopushinskii, who later emigrated from Soviet Russia. These locomotives were the most powerful passenger locomotives in Tsarist Russia. Eighteen locomotives were built between 1914 and 1919, allocated to the Rostov-on-Don, Tihoretskaya, Kavkazkaya, Armavir and Mineralnye Vody depots. They hauled principal express and heavy passenger trains between Rostov-on-Don and Vladikavkaz, a distance of 698 kilometres (434 miles). All were oil fired.

After the October Revolution, a further 48 L class locomotives were built at Putilov Works between 1922 and 1926. At first, these coal fired locomotives were allocated to the October Railway to haul principal passenger trains over a distance of 650 kilometres (400 miles) of double track line between the two largest cities in Soviet Russia, Moscow and Leningrad. At the time, train speeds in Soviet Russia were slow and the fastest train took fourteen hours and thirty minutes between the two cities. The trains, which were running four return workings daily, were rather heavy with train loads often exceeding 700 metric tons behind the tender. In 1936, the express trains were running at an average speed of 65 kilometres per hour (40 miles per hour) with four intermediate stops between these cities. Locomotives were usually changed at Tver.

When the production of the heavier 2-8-4 Berkshire class IS Joseph Stalin got under way in 1937, the Pacifics were modified from coal to oil firing and transferred to join other older locomotives on the North Caucasus lines, from where they worked as far south as to Baku. In 1941, seventeen locomotives were allocated to the North Caucasus Railway, 29 to the Transcaucasus Railway and six to the Orenburg Railway. In 1942, during the German summer invasion into North Caucasus, all the class L Pacifics were evacuated from there to the Transcaucasus Railway. After World War II, in 1947, they were designated Lp class and were relieved from heavier duties. A number were withdrawn from service between 1956 and 1959. The last one, Lp class no. 151, was retired from Grozny depot in 1967.

In 1945, 34 Pacific locomotives of the Deutsche Reichsbahn's Class 03 and two streamlined Class 03.10 Pacific locomotives fell into Russian hands in East Prussia. They were regauged to 5 ft (1,524 mm) gauge and allocated to the Lithuanian Railways, where they hauled express and passenger trains from Vilnius to Kaliningrad (Königsberg) and to Minsk. The last ones were withdrawn from service in 1957.

=== South Africa ===
==== Cape gauge ====
===== Natal Government Railways =====
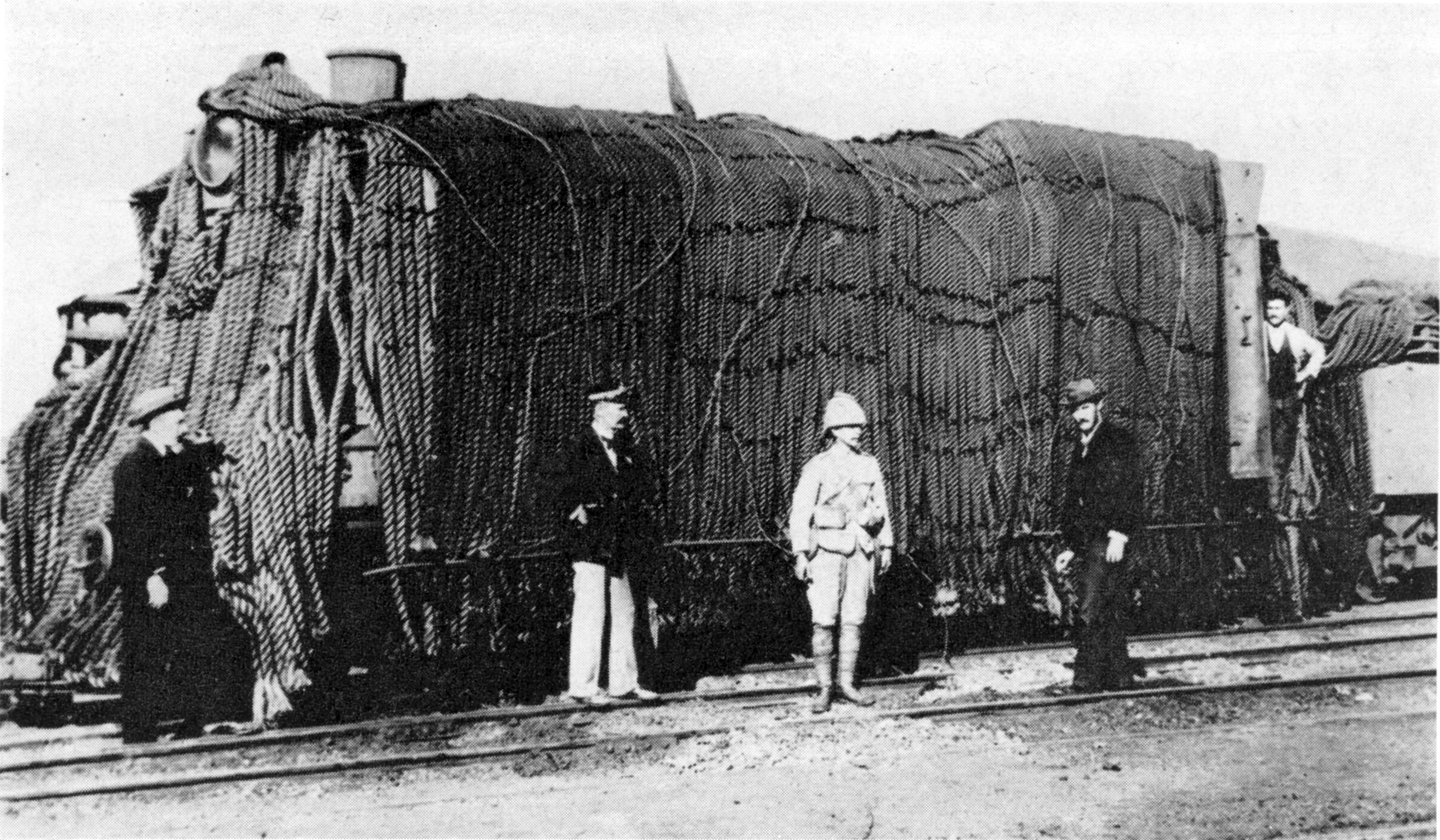
Havelock as Hairy Mary, c. 1898

The first use of the 4-6-2 wheel arrangement in South Africa was c. 1890. During 1887, designs for a 2-8-2 Mikado type tank-and-tender locomotive were prepared by the Natal Government Railways (NGR). The locomotive was built in the Durban workshops and entered service in 1888, named Havelock, but it was soon rebuilt to a 4-6-2 Pacific configuration. Havelock was the first locomotive to be designed and built in South Africa. During the Second Boer War Havelock saw action in service on armoured trains. Unlike usual practice in such cases, the engine was not equipped with armour plate protection, but was draped in strands of thick hemp rope which earned it the apt nickname Hairy Mary amongst the troops.

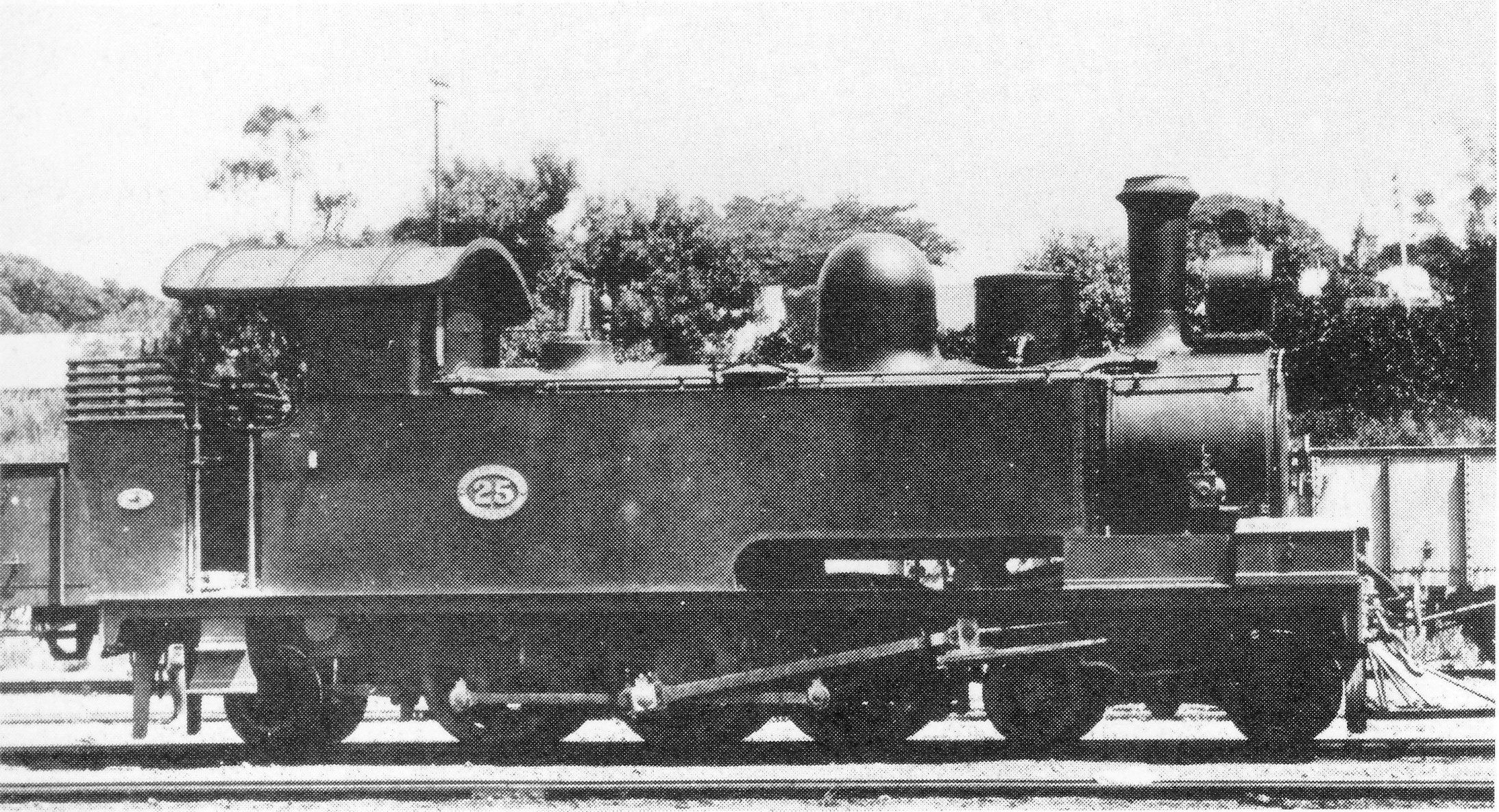
Ex NGR Class K&S, SAR Class C1

In 1901, the NGR rebuilt one of its Class K&S 4-6-0 tank locomotives to a 4-6-2T locomotive to extend its range by providing a larger bunker. In 1912, when it was assimilated into the South African Railways (SAR), it was designated Class C1. In that same year, four more of these locomotives were built from surplus material in the SAR's Durban workshops.

No more tank locomotives with the Pacific wheel arrangement saw use on 3 ft 6 in (1,067 mm) Cape gauge in South Africa. Two Class 2 variants were introduced on the NGR between 1905 and 1910.

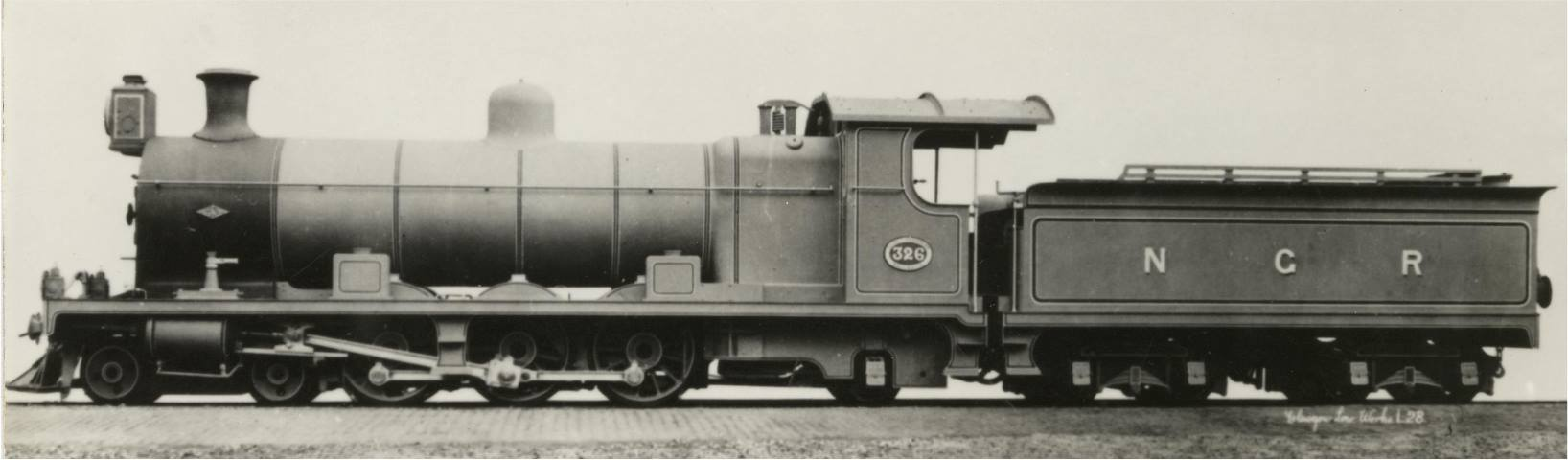
Ex NGR Class Hendrie A, SAR Class 2

- In 1905, two Class A Pacific tender locomotives entered service on the NGR, designed by Locomotive Superintendent D.A. Hendrie and built by NBL. They had plate frames, used saturated steam and had Stephenson valve gear. To accommodate the wide and deep firebox, Hendrie used a bridle casting similar to that introduced on the CGR by Beatty with his Class 6 2-6-2 Prairie in 1903. This method of widening the frames for the firebox continued in South African locomotive design until 1927, when the general adoption of bar frames rendered it no longer necessary. In 1912, they were designated Class 2 on the SAR.
- In addition, two more Class A locomotives, also known as Class Hendrie C, were built in the NGR's Durban workshops in 1910. They were a redesigned version of the Hendrie A, similar in general proportions, but with Walschaerts valve gear, slightly larger diameter coupled wheels, a larger boiler and a more enclosed cab that offered better protection to the crew. In 1912, the SAR designated them Class 2C.

===== Cape Government Railways =====
The first locomotives with a Pacific wheel arrangement in the Cape were two tank locomotives that entered service in 1896 on the private Metropolitan and Suburban Railway that operated a suburban passenger service between Cape Town and Sea Point. In 1901, both locomotives were sold to the Mashonaland Railway.

Three Class 5 and one experimental Karoo tender locomotive variants were introduced on the Cape Government Railways (CGR) between 1903 and 1912.

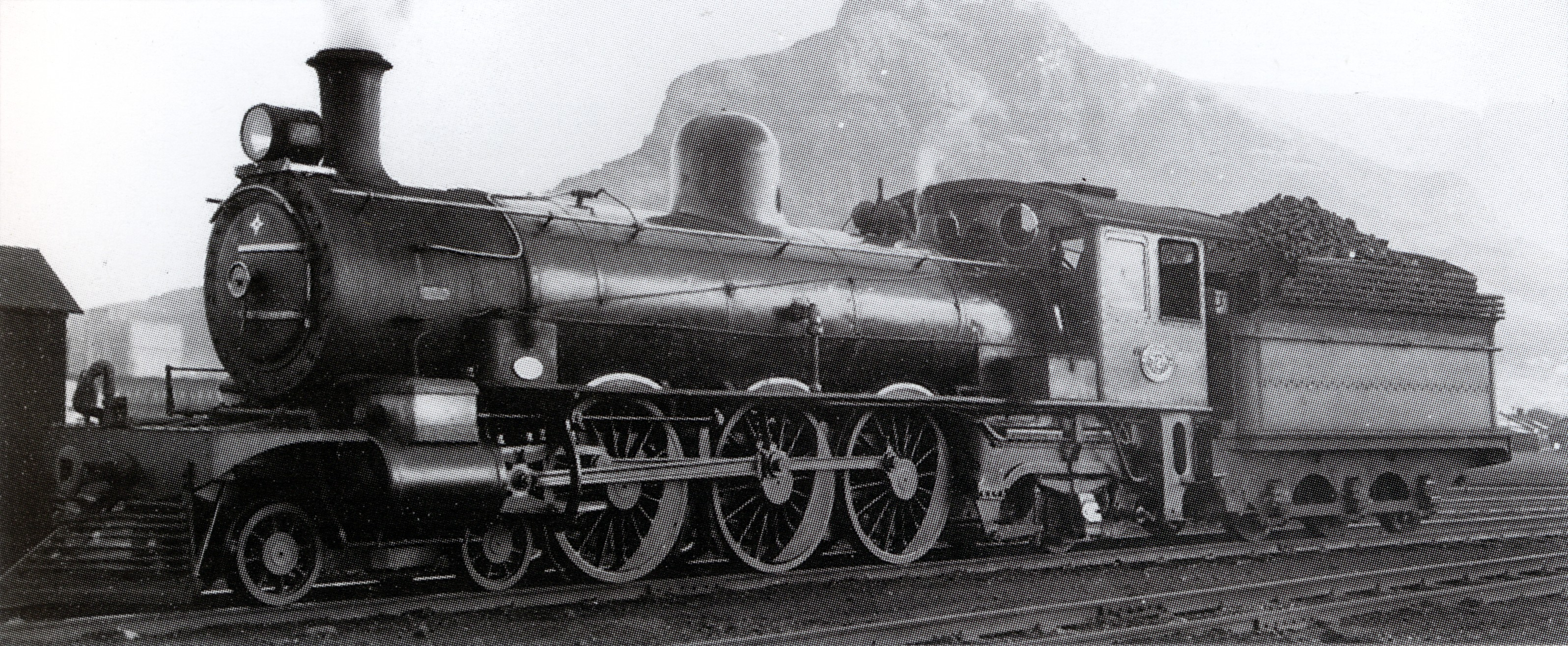
Ex CGR Karoo Class, South African Railways Class 5A

- In 1903, the first two Karoo locomotives entered passenger service on the CGR. It was a development of the CGR Class 6 2-6-2 and was designed by Chief Locomotive Superintendent H.M. Beatty. The locomotives, built by Kitson and Company, were acquired to cope with the increasing weight of passenger trains on the one in eighty ruling gradient between Beaufort West and De Aar in the Karoo, hence the Karoo Class name. In 1912, when they came onto the SAR roster, they were designated Class 5A.
- Following on the success of the first two Karoo Class locomotives, a further four were ordered from Beyer, Peacock & Company in 1904. They were modified slightly in view of the experience gained with the original two. On the SAR, they were all designated Class 5B, until one was later reboilered with a Watson Standard no. 1 boiler and reclassified Class 5BR. All of them were later equipped with piston valve cylinders and superheaters.
- In 1907, the CGR placed a single experimental three-cylinder compound Pacific in service, based on the second Karoo Class. Built by the North British Locomotive Company (NBL), it was not classified and was simply referred to as the Three Cylinder Compound. The cylinders were arranged in the Smith system of compounding, with a single high-pressure cylinder situated between the two low-pressure cylinders. The locomotive had a bar frame, Walschaerts valve gear and used saturated steam. Compared to a simplex two-cylinder Karoo, the compound could take a heavy train up a long continuous grade at a much higher speed, while experienced drivers found it could outperform the Karoo in terms of power as well as fuel and water consumption. In 1912, the SAR classified it as Class Experimental 1.
- The Enlarged Karoo, built by Vulcan Foundry, was one of the locomotive types that were designed and ordered by the CGR before the SAR was established and that ended up being delivered to the newly established national railways of the Union of South Africa in 1912. It was a larger and heavier version of the Class 5B, with a higher pitched boiler, Belpaire firebox, larger diameter leading and coupled wheels and larger cylinders. The four locomotives were designated Class 5. One of them was later reboilered with a Watson Standard no. 1 boiler, equipped with a superheater and reclassified to Class 5R.

===== Central South African Railways =====
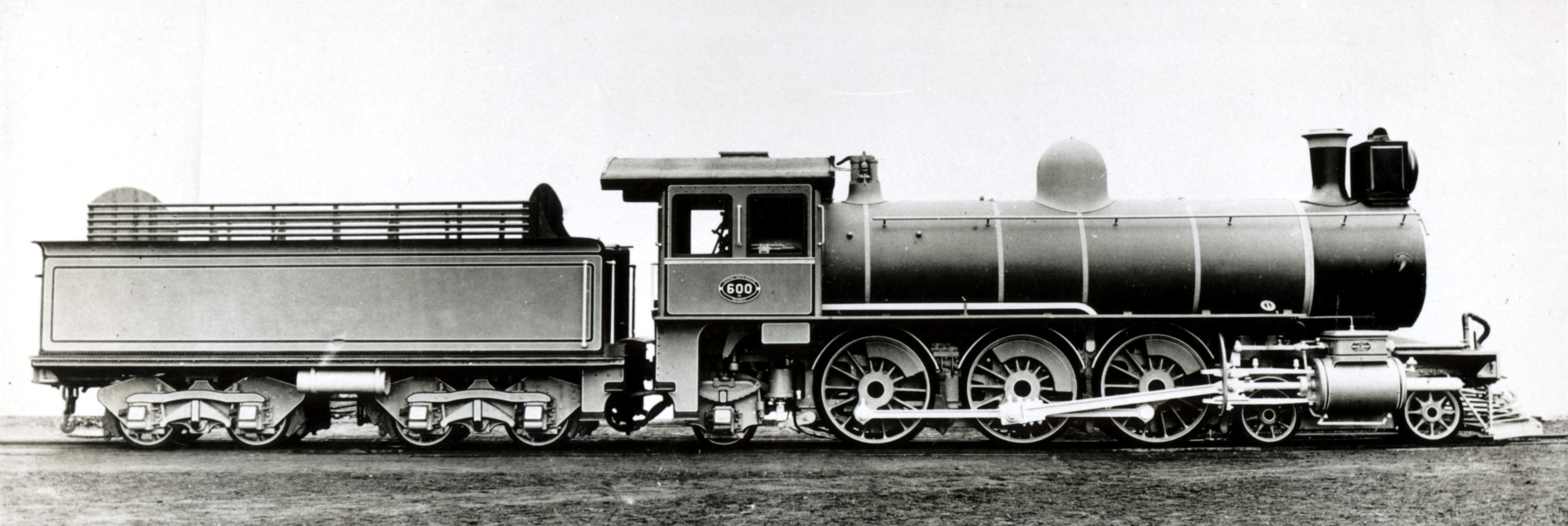
CSAR Class 9 no. 600, South African Railways no. 727

Five Class 9 Pacific passenger locomotives, designed by P.A. Hyde, the first Chief Locomotive Superintendent of the Central South African Railways (CSAR), were delivered from Vulcan Foundry in 1904. They had bar frames, Stephenson valve gear and used saturated steam, and proved very useful for passenger work with moderate loads, working the mail trains from Johannesburg to Durban as far as Charlestown on the Transvaal-Natal border for many years. They retained their Class 9 classification on the SAR.

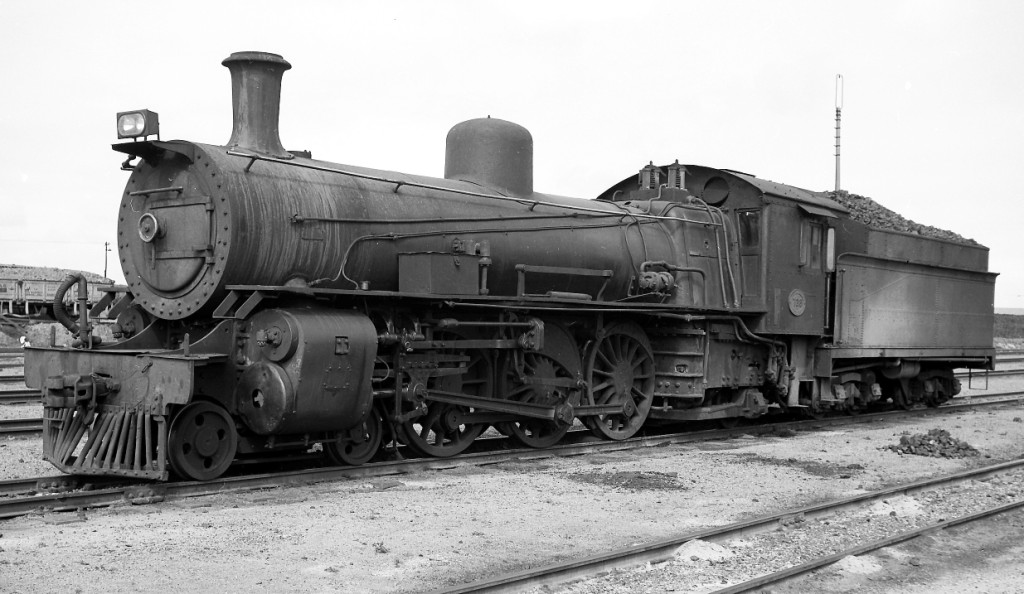
CSAR Class 10 no. 656, South African Railways no. 738

Five Class 10 variants were introduced between 1904 and 1910.

- Also in 1904 and also designed by Hyde, fifteen Class 10 Pacific locomotives were delivered to the CSAR from NBL. The locomotives were of an extremely advanced design, superheated and with the highest boiler pitch yet in South Africa, with plate frames, wide Belpaire fireboxes, outside admission piston valves and Walschaerts valve gear. In 1912, when they were assimilated into the SAR, they retained their Class 10 classification.
- Ten heavy Pacific passenger locomotives, designed by CSAR Chief Mechanical Engineer (CME) G.G. Elliot based on Hyde's Class 10 design, were ordered from NBL and delivered in 1910. They had plate frames, Belpaire fireboxes and Walschaerts valve gear and were delivered in two variants, five of them using saturated steam while the rest were superheated. While similar to the Class 10, their boilers were arranged further forwards, their firebox throats and back plates were sloped instead of being vertical, they used inside admission piston valves and their valve gear was reversed by means of a vertical steam reversing engine mounted on the right-hand running board. They were all classified as Class 10-2 by the CSAR but, in 1912, the SAR designated the saturated steam locomotives Class 10A and the superheated ones Class 10B. A further five superheated Class 10B locomotives were delivered to the SAR from Beyer, Peacock in 1912.
- Twelve light Pacific locomotives were also placed in service by the CSAR in 1910, classified as Class 10-C. Designed by Elliot and built by NBL, they were similar to the Class 10-2, but slightly smaller and with smaller coupled wheels. They used saturated steam and had Belpaire fireboxes and Walschaerts valve gear, but they were soon reboilered and equipped with superheaters. In 1912 they were designated Class 10C by the SAR.
- One more Pacific was ordered by the CSAR from ALCO in 1910. It was superheated and built to very much the same specifications as that of the Class 10-2 of that same year, but with a bar frame. It was slightly more powerful than the Class 10-2 and was designated Class 10 by the CSAR, along with the fifteen locomotives of 1904. In 1912, the locomotive became the sole Class 10D on the SAR.

===== South African Railways =====
Seven Class 16 variants were introduced on the South African Railways (SAR) between 1914 and 1935.

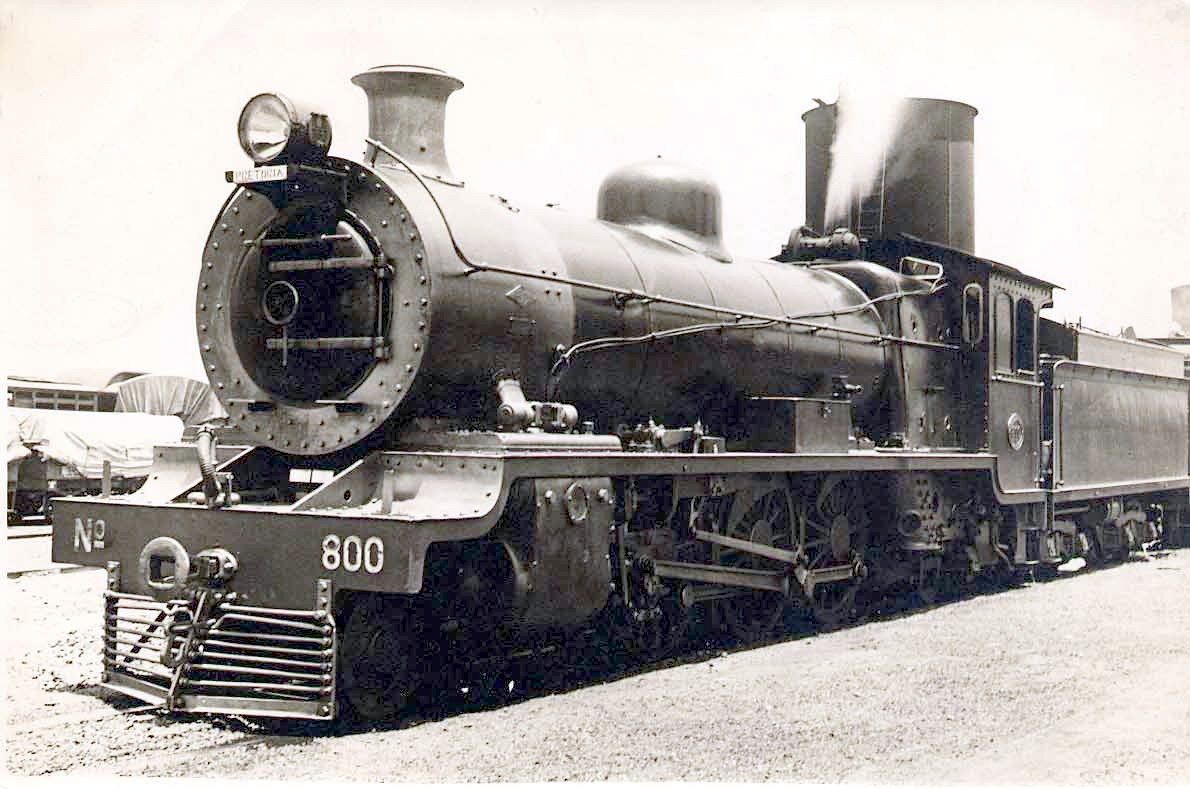
South African Railways Class 16 no. 800, c. 1930

- The Class 16 Pacific was designed by Hendrie, CME of the SAR from 1910 to 1922, and was built by NBL, who delivered twelve locomotives in 1914. The design closely followed that of the Class 15 4-8-2 Mountain type that was introduced at the same time from the same builders, and many parts were made interchangeable. They had Walschaerts valve gear, were superheated and had Belpaire fireboxes. At the time, it was considered a very large and powerful express locomotive, even when compared to British locomotives built to run on 4 ft 8 1/2 in (1,435 mm) standard gauge. With 60-inch (1,524 mm) coupled wheels, the ratio of wheel diameter to rail gauge was the same as that of a Standard gauge locomotive having 81-inch (2,057 mm) coupled wheels. Their tractive effort of 29,890 pounds-force (133.0 kilonewtons) at 75% boiler pressure exceeded the 27,800 pounds-force (123.7 kilonewtons) at 85% boiler pressure of Churchward's The Great Bear on the Great Western Railway and equalled, also at 85% boiler pressure, that of Gresley's subsequent Great Northern Pacifics. This made the Class 16 the most powerful express passenger locomotive design yet to have been built in Britain at the time.
- The Class 16A four-cylinder simplex Pacific of 1915 was designed by Hendrie and built by NBL. Two locomotives were delivered, identical in most respects to their predecessor Class 16 except that they had four cylinders instead of the usual two. All four cylinders were arranged in line below the smokebox and were the same size, with the outer cylinders driving the centre coupled wheels while the inner cylinders operated on a cranked leading coupled wheel axle. The result was a very smooth running locomotive, capable of very fast running, but since the available space on a Cape gauge locomotive prevented larger cylinders from being fitted, the four-cylinder design was never repeated by the SAR.

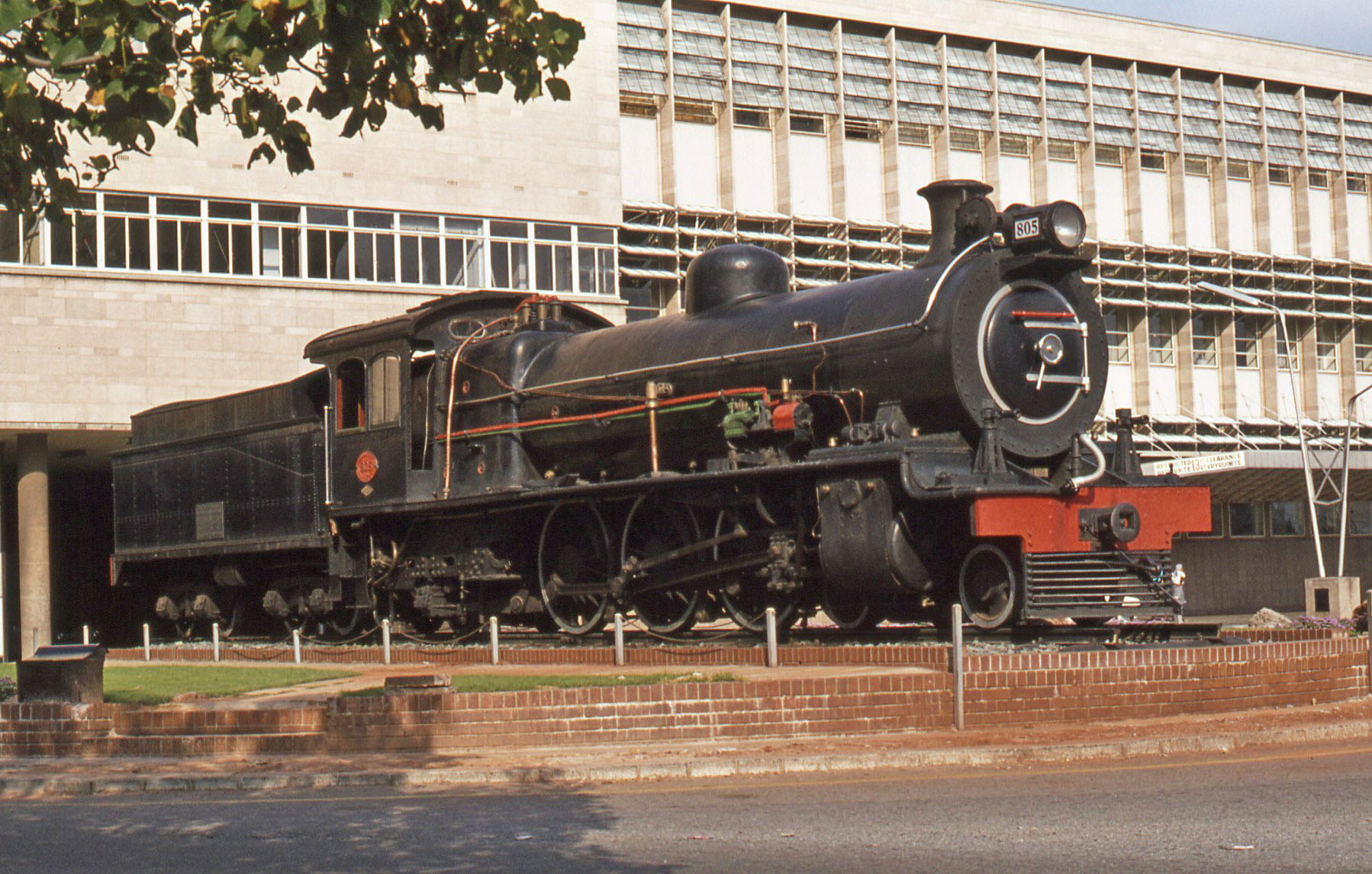
South African Railways Class 16B No. 805 restored to its as-delivered appearance

- The Class 16B Pacific, also designed by Hendrie, was also built by NBL, who delivered ten locomotives in November 1917. They were identical to the predecessor Class 16 and successor Class 16C in most respects, except that they had wider cabs than the Class 16, while the Class 16C had a combustion chamber in the firebox. All ten were eventually reboilered with Watson Standard no 2B boilers and Watson cabs with slanted fronts, and reclassified to Class 16CR.
- Ten Class 16C locomotives, also designed by Hendrie and built by NBL, were delivered in 1919 with another twenty following in 1922. Identical to predecessors Class 16 and Class 16B in most respects except for the addition of a combustion chamber, they proved to be excellent free-steaming, fast and reliable locomotives with a reserve of power greater than either of the predecessors. All thirty were later reboilered with Watson Standard no 2B boilers and also reclassified to Class 16CR.

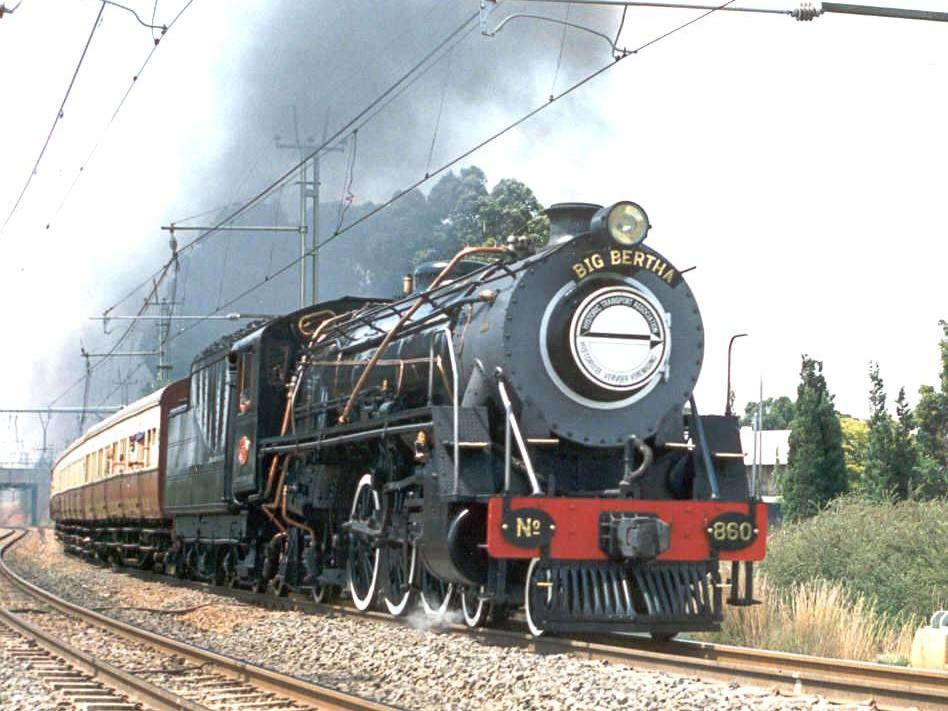
South African Railways Class 16D no. 860

- Seven Class 16D Pacific locomotives were built for the SAR by Baldwin Locomotive Works in 1925 and 1926. The Class was designed for working the Union Limited and Union Express fast passenger trains, forerunners of the Blue Train, between Johannesburg and Cape Town. The builders conformed to SAR requirements, but also incorporated the latest American railway engineering practices and introduced several new features to the SAR, such as top feeds to the boiler, self-cleaning smokeboxes, Sellar's drifting valves, grease lubrication and arch tubes to support the brick arch and improve circulation. It had a bar frame extending from the front buffer beam to the rear dragbox, while its size earned it the nickname Big Bertha. In 1926, no. 860 made locomotive history by hauling the Union Limited over the 956 miles (1,539 kilometres) from Johannesburg to Cape Town in 29 hours.
- When orders for more Pacific locomotives were placed in 1928, the Class 16D design was modified by the CME, Colonel F.R. Collins DSO, who shortened the frame to end at the front of the firebox and added a bridle casting. This resulted in a wider frame below the firebox and cab and consequently more ashpan room. Fourteen Class 16DA locomotives were built to this design, six by Hohenzollern Locomotive Works in 1928 and eight by Baldwin in 1929. The Hohenzollern and Baldwin locomotives differed from the Class 16D only by virtue of its shortened frame.

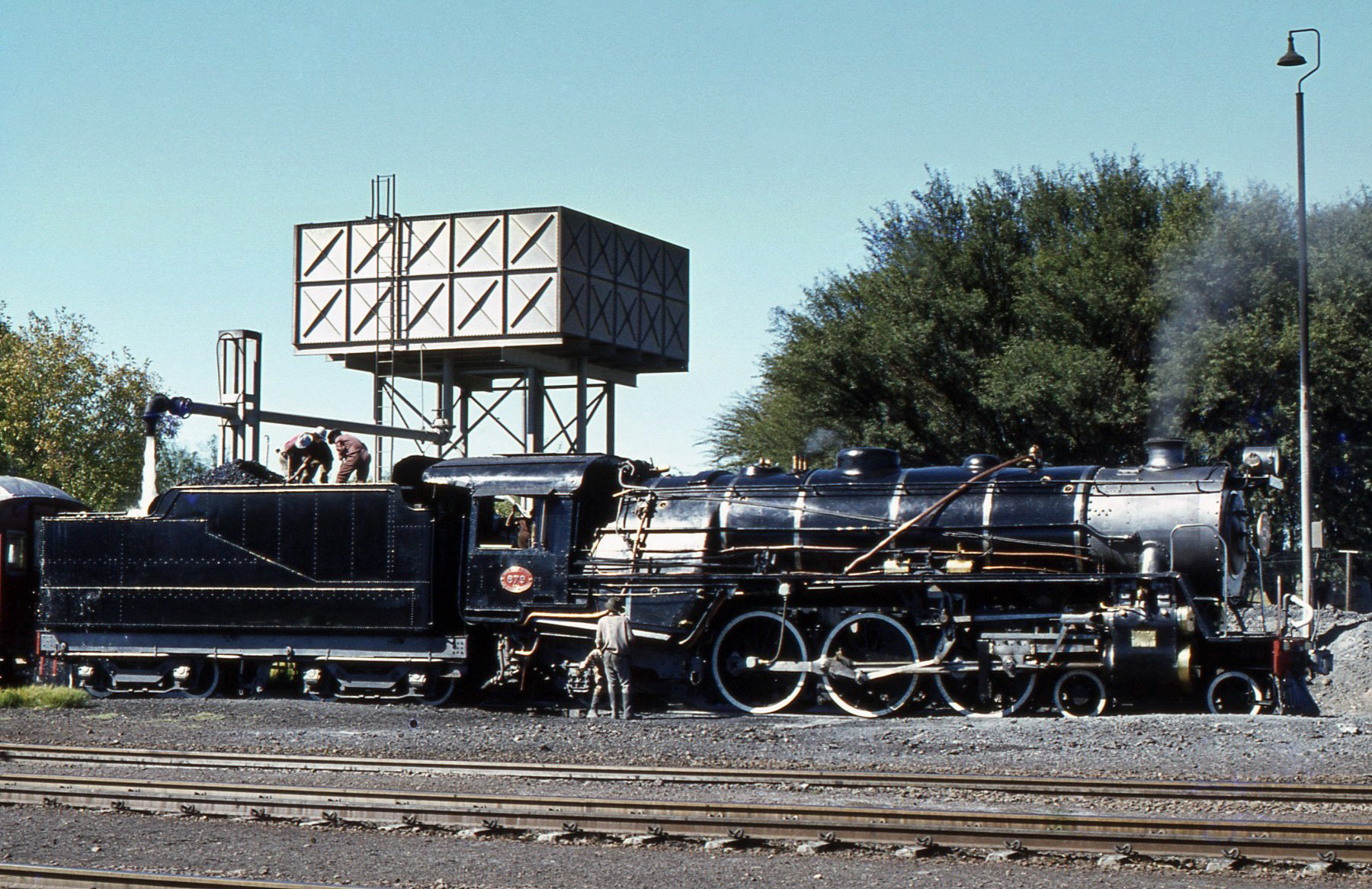
Henschel-built South African Railways Class 16DA of 1930

- When A.G. Watson succeeded Collins as CME in 1929, he designed a boiler with a very wide firebox of the Wootten type, with a grate area of 60 square feet (5.6 square metres) to improve the steaming properties of these locomotives. The grate was 15 square feet (1.4 square metres) larger than that of the Hohenzollern and Baldwin locomotives and these boilers were installed on the final six Class 16DA locomotives, built by Henschel in 1930. These locomotives were sufficiently different from the Baldwin and Hohenzollern-builts to justify a separate classification such as Class 16DB, but this did not happen. The steaming ability of these six, known as the Class 16DA Wide Firebox, was phenomenal and led to the adoption of wide fireboxes without combustion chambers as the standard on all subsequent SAR mainline locomotives.

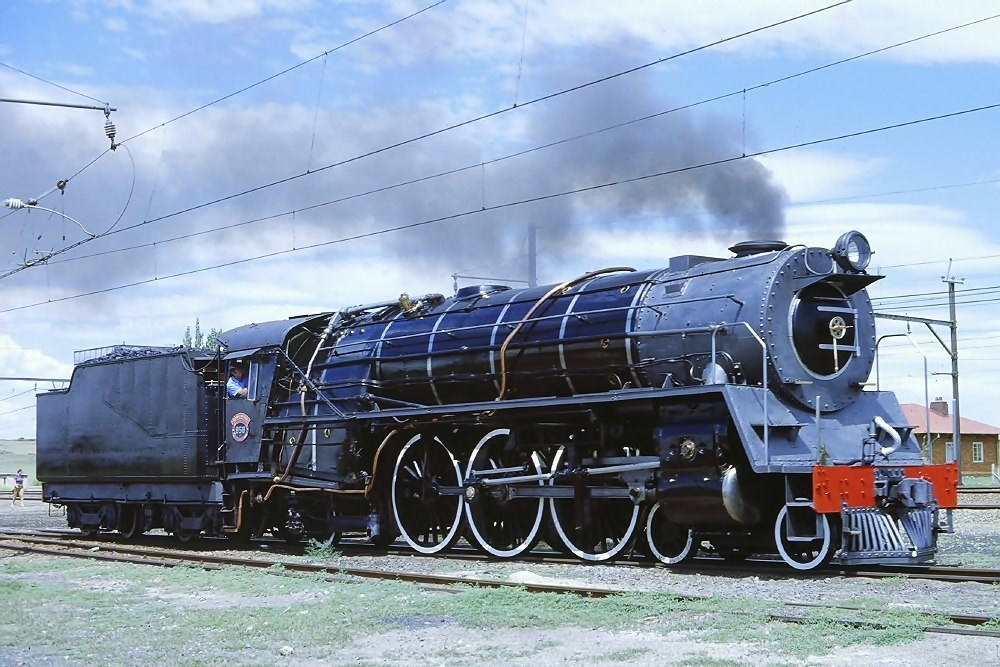
South African Railways Class 16E No. 858

- The Class 16E Pacific was designed by Watson and built by Henschel, who delivered six locomotives in 1935. With its 72-inch-diameter (1,829 mm) coupled wheels, it was considered to be the most remarkable Cape gauge express passenger locomotive ever built. The coupled wheels were the largest ever used on any less than 4 ft 8 1/2 in (1,435 mm) standard gauge locomotive, and it had an all-up weight and tractive effort equal to or exceeding that of most Pacifics outside North America. It used rotary cam poppet valve gear driven by outside rotary shafts, which resulted in extremely free-running characteristics. It also boasted the largest fire grate on any Pacific outside North America. The Class 16E had a Watson Standard no. 3A boiler and, at 9 feet 3 inches (2.819 metres) above rail level, its boiler centre-line was the highest-pitched on the SAR. This and the limitations of the loading gauge made it impossible to install a normal steam dome and its place was taken by an inspection man-hole. Steam was collected through numerous small feeder pipes fixed into two collector pipes, which were arranged as high as possible above the water surface. The collector pipes joined together to form a main steam pipe, 7 inches (178 millimetres) in diameter, which led to the superheater header and multiple valve regulator, situated in the smokebox.

==== Narrow gauge ====
In 1906, two small 4-6-2 side-tank locomotives, designed by Hendrie and built by Hunslet, entered service on the 2 ft (610 mm) Estcourt-Weenen narrow gauge railway of the NGR. They had outside plate frames and used Walschaerts valve gear. They were commonly known as Hunslet Side Tanks since all narrow gauge locomotives on the NGR were designated Class N. Although they came onto the SAR roster in 1912, they were never classified since they were sold to the Moçâmedes Railway in Portuguese West Africa in 1915, long before a system of grouping narrow gauge locomotives into classes was introduced by the SAR somewhere between 1928 and 1930.

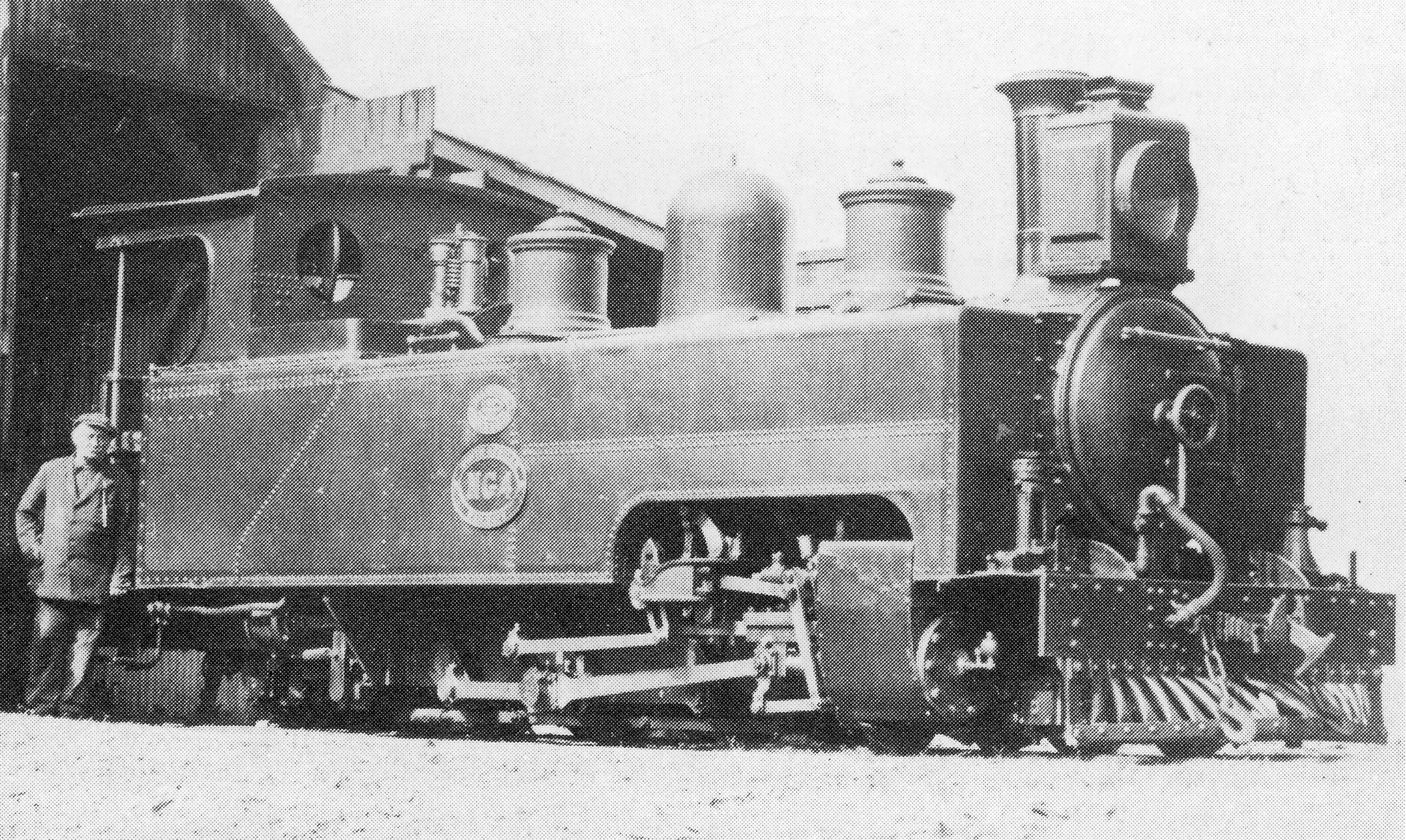
NGR Hawthorn Leslie, South African Railways Class NG3

In 1907, the NGR placed another six 4-6-2T tank locomotives in service, designed by Hendrie based on his Hunslet Side Tank. Built by Hawthorn Leslie and Company, they also had outside plate frames and used Walschaerts valve gear. They were commonly known as the Hawthorn Leslie Side Tanks and were acquired specifically for the new narrow gauge Donnybrook-Esperanza Railway in Natal. They came onto the SAR roster in 1912 and were later classified as Class NG3.

In 1908, two Pacific tank locomotives with bar frames and Walschaerts valve gear, built by Bagnall, entered service on the narrow gauge Walmer Branch of the CGR in Port Elizabeth. They came onto the SAR roster in 1912 and remained in service until the Walmer branch was closed in 1929.

In 1911, shortly before being amalgamated into the SAR, the NGR placed the first two of seven 4-6-2T narrow gauge locomotives in service, built by Kerr, Stuart & Company using the Hawthorn Leslie drawings for the Class NG3. Two more followed in 1913 and another three in 1914, also from Kerr, Stuart. While virtually identical to the Hawthorn Leslie Side Tanks, their boiler pitch had been raised 3 inches (76 millimetres) to make a larger firebox possible. They also had higher side tanks and less ornate sand boxes on top of the boiler. Between 1928 and 1930 they were all classified as Class NG4.

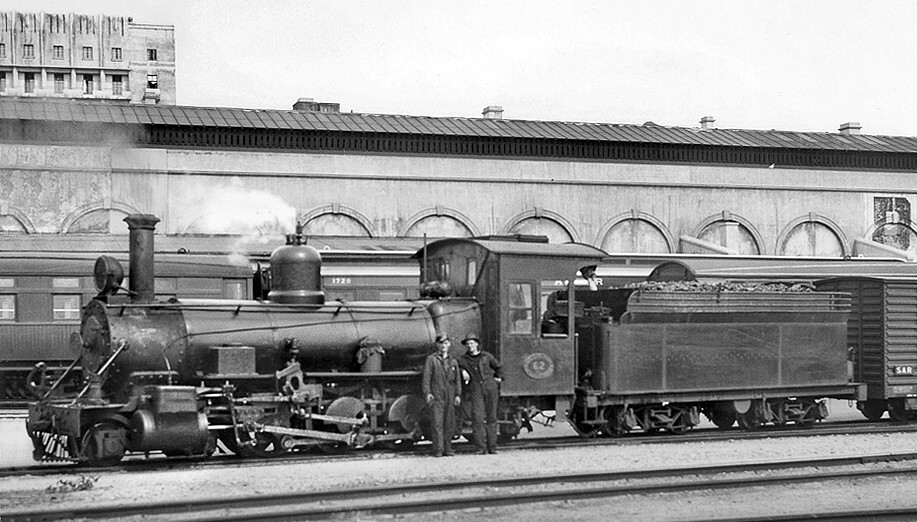
South African Railways Class NG10 no. NG62, c. 1930

In 1916, the SAR ordered six narrow gauge Pacific tender locomotives from Baldwin Locomotive Works. They had outside bar frames and Walschaerts valve gear and became popularly known as the Sixties, based on their engine number range. Typically American in appearance, with an ornate chimney cap and steam dome as well as a separate engine number on a disk on the front of the smokebox door, they were the only narrow gauge Pacific tender locomotives to see service on the SAR. Later designated Class NG10, they were placed in service on the Langkloof line between Port Elizabeth and Avontuur in the Eastern Cape, where they spent most of their working lives. In 1948, two of them were transferred to South West Africa (SWA). All six were withdrawn from service by 1962 as a direct result of the widening of the narrow gauge lines in SWA to 3 ft 6 in (1,067 mm) Cape gauge.

=== Spain ===
A Pacific locomotive was ordered by the Ferrocarril Madrid-Aragon from Forges, Usines et Fonderies de Haine-Saint-Pierre in Belgium in 1914, but was not delivered, presumably due to the disruption to trade caused by World War I. The locomotive was eventually sold to the French-owned Imperial Railway Company of Ethiopia in 1923. (Also see Ethiopia)

In 1958, the La Robla railway purchased four vintage 1,000 mm (3 ft 3 3/8 in) metre gauge Pacific locomotives from the Tunisian Railways. These had been built in 1914 by Société Alsacienne de Constructions Mécaniques (SACM). They were numbered 181 to 185 and were scrapped in the early 1970s after having served in Spain for more than ten years. (Also see Tunisia)

=== Sweden ===
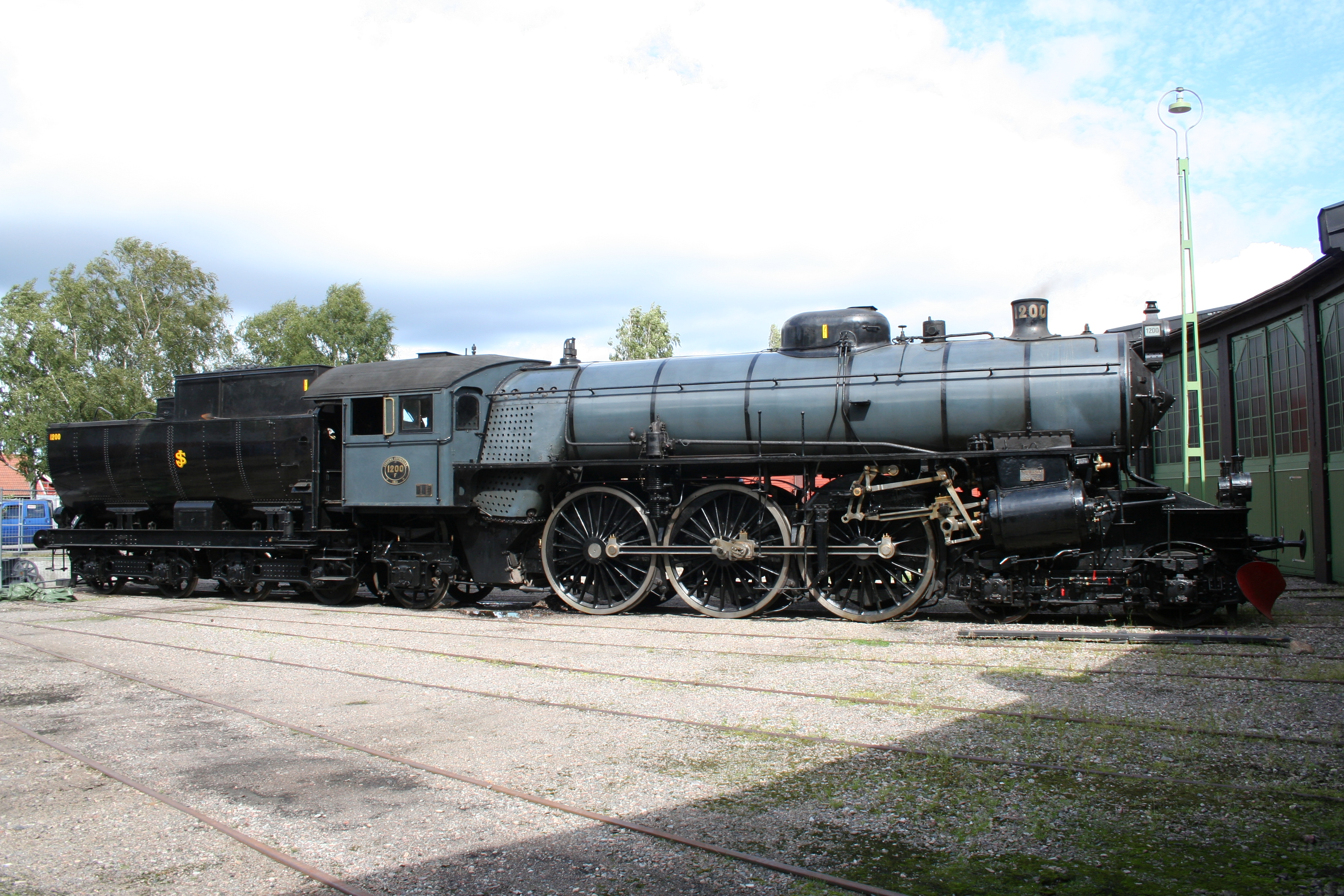
SJ Class F

In 1913, the Swedish State Railways (Statens Järnvägar or SJ) ordered eleven four-cylinder compound Pacific type locomotives from Nydqvist & Holm (NOHAB) for the Stockholm-Malmö heavy express train service. They had 1,880-millimetre-diameter (74.0 in) coupled wheels with two 420-by-660-millimetre (16.5 in × 26.0 in) and two 630-by-660-millimetre (24.8 in × 26.0 in) cylinders. They were designated the SJ class F, numbered from 1200 to 1209 and 1271.

The locomotives were limited to a maximum speed of 90 kilometres per hour (56 miles per hour). They hauled express trains on this southern mainline until the electrification of the Stockholm-Malmö line in 1933. The SJ then tried them on the Gothenburg non-electrified section, but they were not a success on this line which was also due to be electrified. They were then all sold to the neighbouring Danish State Railways (DSB) in 1937.

After they were withdrawn from service in Denmark, DSB no. 964 (ex SJ no. 1200) was presented to the Swedish Railway Museum at Gävle in 1964, while DSB no. 966 (ex SJ no. 1202) was presented to SJ AB by the Danish Railway Museum in 1999, to haul heritage trains.

=== Taiwan ===
The first Pacific type locomotives appeared in Formosa (now Taiwan) in 1912 when ALCO-Rogers delivered three locomotives that were derived from the Japanese Government Railways type 8900. They were numbered from 200 to 202. One more locomotive, number 203, was delivered in 1913. They hauled the most important passenger express trains between Taihoku and Takao.

In 1935, five more locomotives of the Japanese Government Railways Class 55 were added, numbered 551 to 555, and in 1938 four more were delivered, numbered 556 to 559.

Hitachi delivered eight more Japanese Class 57 locomotives, presumably as war reparations, to the Taiwan Railway Administration. These were the last Pacific type locomotives to arrive in Taiwan under the Chiang Kai-shek administration.

=== Thailand ===
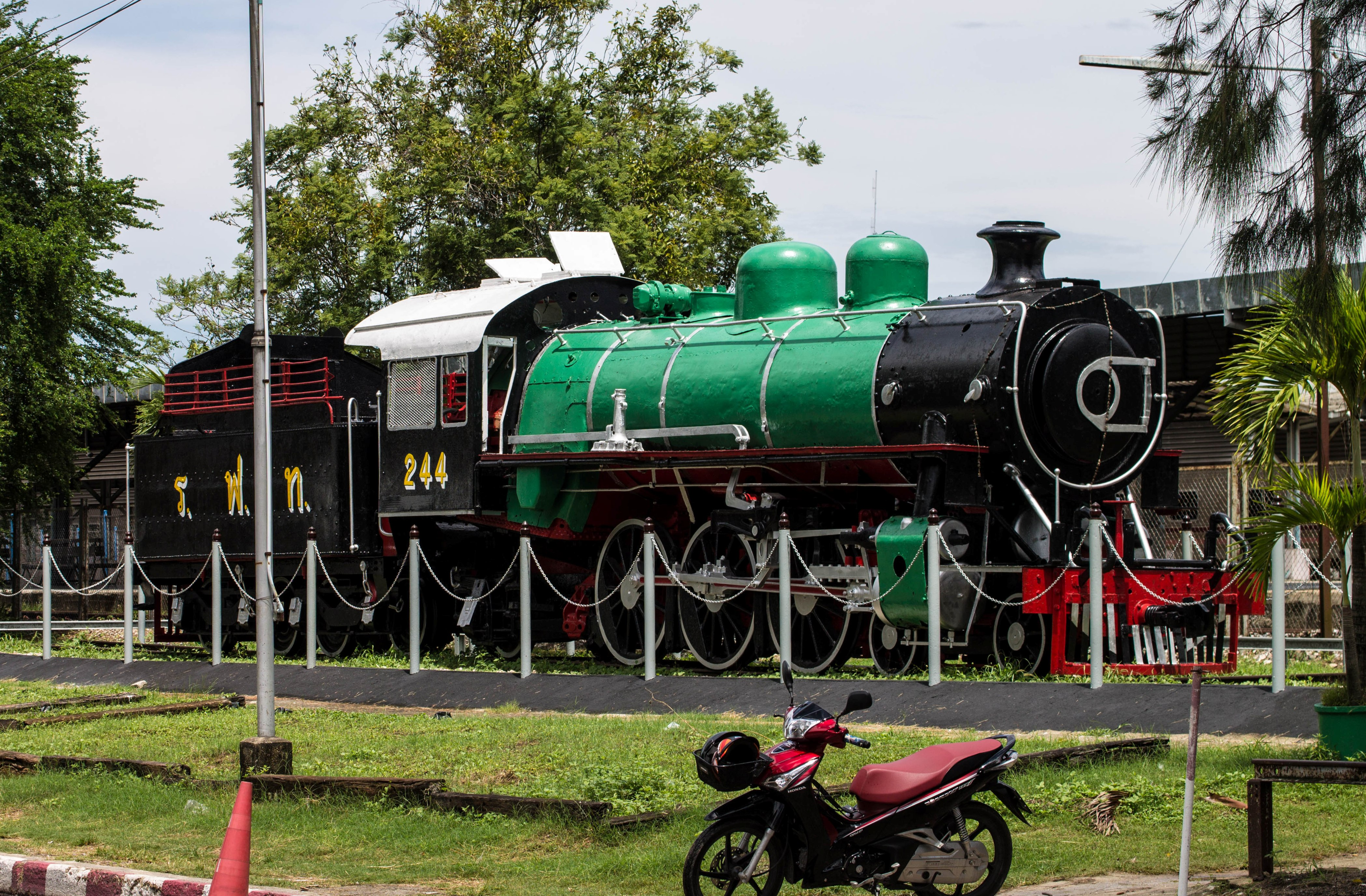
SRT No. 244 steam engine nearby Hat Yai Junction station.

The Royal State Railways of Siam (RSR), the predecessor of the State Railway of Thailand (SRT), introduced new standard Pacific locomotives for express trains and mixed-traffic trains to supersede the E-Class locomotives which had been commissioned between 1915 and 1921. The first type of Pacific Locomotive was purchased from Batignolles-Châtillon in France in 1925. Others followed from Baldwin Locomotive Works between 1926 and 1929 and were prominent on Southern lines. There were also the successful Hanomag Pacific locomotives of 1928–1929, the design of which late became a model for the Pacific locomotives imported from Japan.

The final type of Pacific steam locomotive was when RSR imported the parts for 10 locomotives, based on the Hanomag design, from Japan during 1942 and 1943. However, assembly of these at the Makkasan Factory was not completed until 1945.

After the World War II, RSR imported a further thirty Pacific type locomotives from Japan in 1949–50, numbered 821 to 850. Two of them, numbers 824 and 850, were still in service with SRT in 2014 for special nostalgic trips.

=== Tunisia ===
==== Standard gauge ====
In 1914, the Tunisian Chemins de fer Bône-Guelma placed five 4 ft 8 1/2 in (1,435 mm) standard gauge Pacific locomotives in service at Tunis, built by Société Alsacienne de Constructions Mécaniques (SACM). They were numbered 181 to 185, later to be renumbered to Tunisian Railways (Société Nationale de Chemins de Fer Tunisiens) numbers 231.181 to 231.185. A further four were supplied in 1923 and three more in 1938, also built by SACM. They worked the 211-kilometre (131 mi) line from Tunis to Ghardimaou on the Algerian border, hauling the Tunis-Algiers direct express trains. They also worked some semi-fast passenger trains on the 98-kilometre (61 mi) line between Tunis and Bizerta.

They hauled all principal express and passenger trains between Tunis Ville and Ghardimaou until 1951, when the new mainline diesels relegated them to secondary trains. All were withdrawn from service during 1954 and 1955.

==== Metre gauge ====
Also in 1914, the Chemins de fer Bône-Guelma ordered five 1,000 mm (3 ft 3 3/8 in) metre gauge locomotives from SACM. The engine weight in working order was 56.6 metric tonnes, with coupled wheels of 1,500 millimetres (59.1 inches) diameter and two 465-by-610-millimetre (18.3 in × 24.0 in) cylinders.

They were considered very successful and Tunisian Railways ordered three more in 1928. These were used on the 149-kilometre (93 mi) mainline south from Tunis to Sousse and the 279-kilometre (173 mi) line to Sfax. Between the two World Wars, they were renowned for providing the fastest metre gauge service in the world and speeds of over 100 kilometres per hour (62 miles per hour) were common in ordinary service.

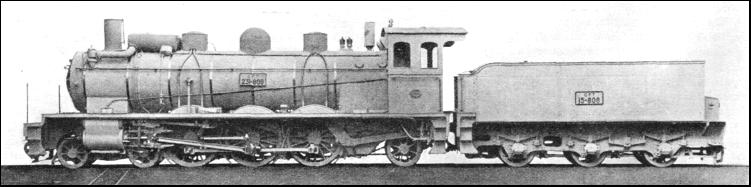
Metre gauge Pacific No. 231.808

When the Tunisian Railways dieselised between 1951 and 1955, these locomotives were withdrawn from service and placed in staging, even though as late as in 1952 they still regularly achieved speeds of up to 110 kilometres per hour (68 miles per hour). In 1958, numbers 231.801, 231.805, 231.807 and 231.808 were sold to the La Robla railway in Spain. Those which remained in Tunisia were scrapped in 1959. (Also see Spain)

=== United Kingdom ===
==== Tender locomotives ====
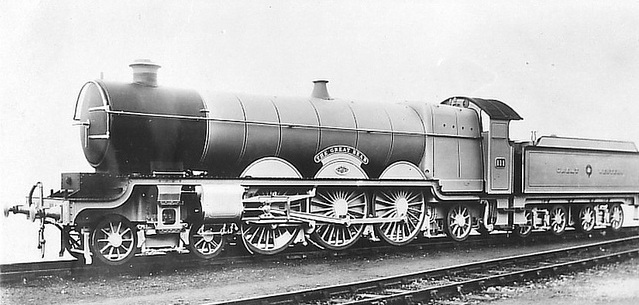
GWR no.111, The Great Bear

Prior to the 1923 Grouping, only five 4-6-2 locomotives had been built in the United Kingdom. The first of these was No. 111, The Great Bear, introduced by the Great Western Railway (GWR) in 1908. This was an experimental locomotive which proved to be more powerful than the railway's requirements and also too heavy for much of its infrastructure. As a result, it was scrapped in 1924 and many of the parts were used to build a GWR 4073 Castle Class 4-6-0 "ten-wheeler"" locomotive.

The Great Northern Railway (GNR) and the North Eastern Railway (NER) each built two Pacific types in 1922, later to become the Classes A1/A3 and A2 on the London and North Eastern Railway (LNER). Further examples of these two classes were built by the LNER after 1923.

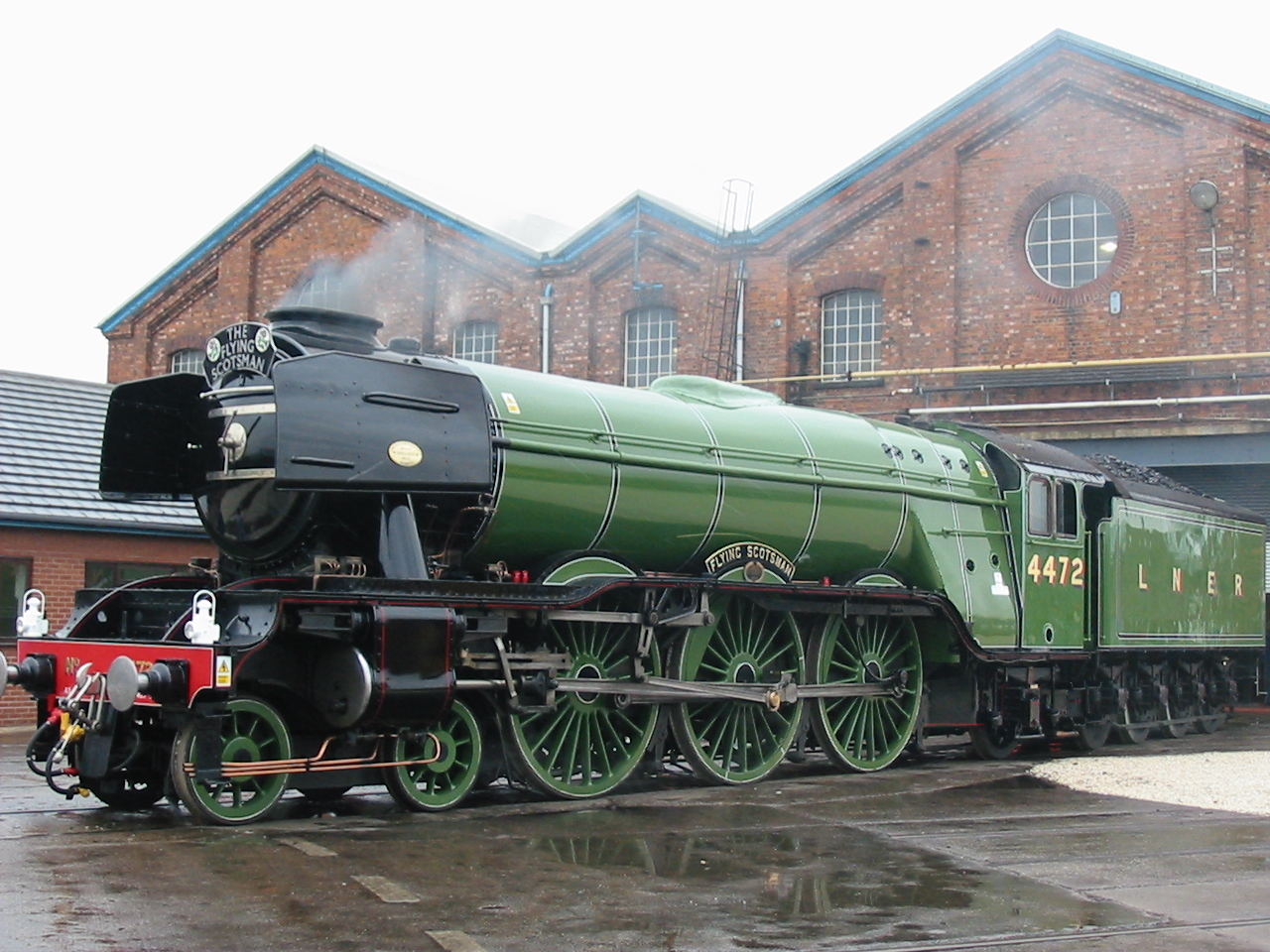
Flying Scotsman

The GNR Class A1, designed by Nigel Gresley and later rebuilt into the improved Class A3, featured three cylinders and an innovative conjugated valve gear. The class eventually consisted of 79 locomotives. After initial teething problems, it proved to be an excellent design and one of them, Flying Scotsman, was the first locomotive to be officially recorded as reaching 100 miles per hour (160 kilometres per hour).

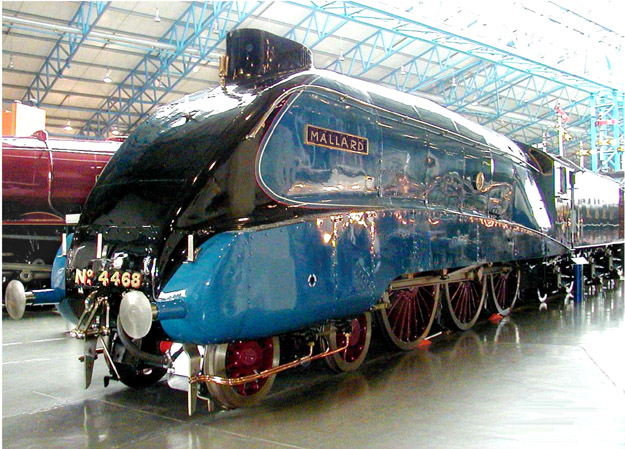
The Mallard, holder of the world speed record for steam traction.

This speed was surpassed by the streamlined LNER Class A4 of 1935, when No. 2509 Silver Link reached 112 miles per hour (180 kilometres per hour) on its inaugural run in 1935. Three years later, on 3 July 1938, No. 4468 Mallard touched 126 miles per hour (203 kilometres per hour), which is still the world speed record for steam traction. 35 locomotives of the class were built by 1938.

A further 89 Pacific locomotives of the Peppercorn Class A1, Thompson Class A1/1, Peppercorn Class A2, Thompson Class A2/1, Thompson Class A2/2 and Thompson Class A2/3 were either built or rebuilt for the LNER by Edward Thompson and Arthur Peppercorn, although many actually only appeared in the British Railways (BR) era after 1948. In 2008, one further locomotive of the Peppercorn Class A1 design, the 60163 Tornado, was built by the A1 Steam Locomotive Trust.

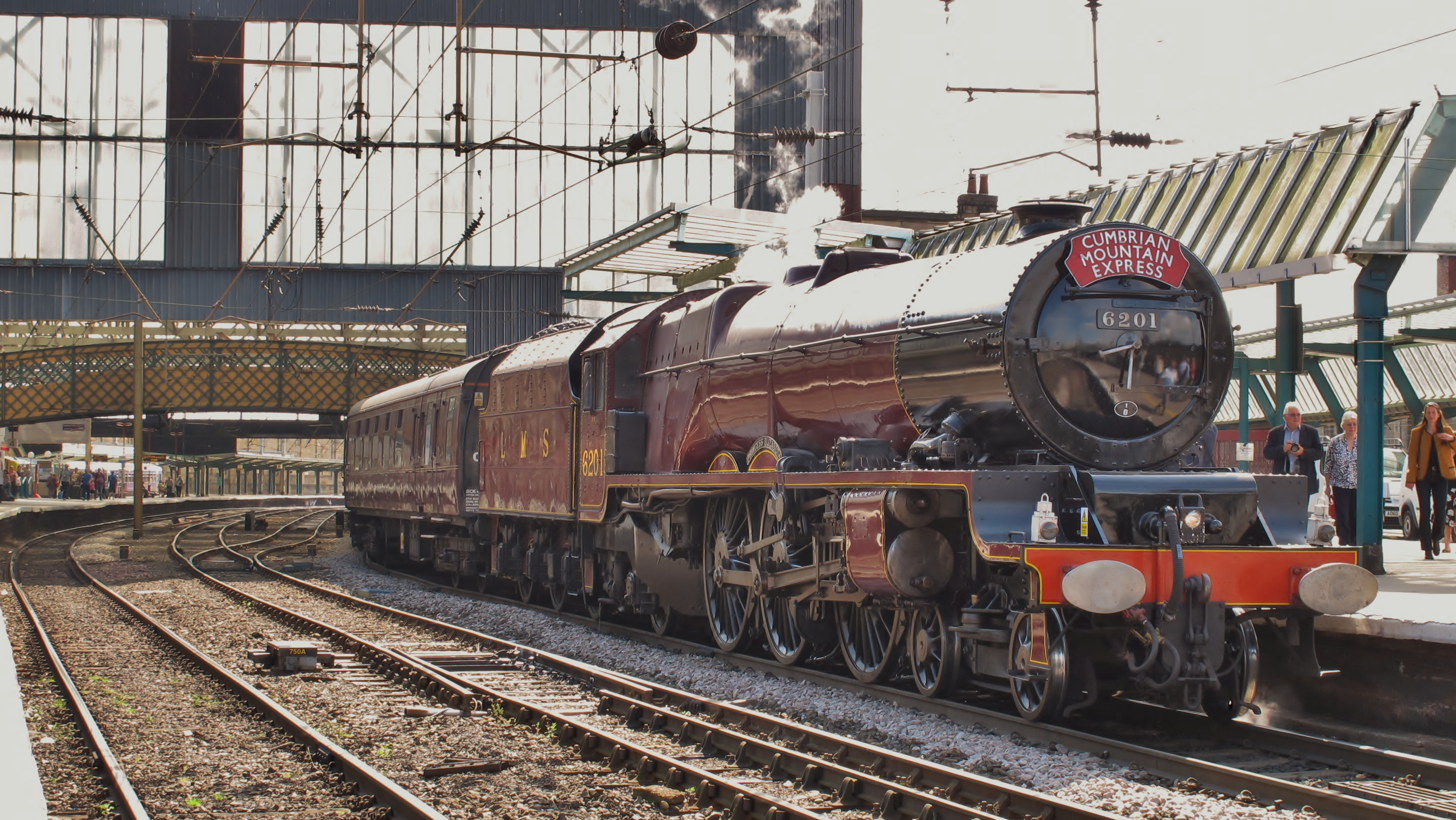
LMS Princess Royal Class "Princess Elizabeth"

The London, Midland and Scottish Railway (LMS) introduced its twelve Princess Royal Class Pacific locomotives in 1933 and then enlarged the design with the streamlined Princess Coronation Class of 1937. 37 locomotives of the Coronation Class were built by 1947, with one more appearing in 1948 in the BR era. Coronation No. 6220, the first of the class, reached 114 miles per hour (183 kilometres per hour) on 29 June 1937 and briefly held the British speed record for steam traction, until it was bettered by the LNER Mallard a year later. The LMS Princess Royal Class was also used as the basis for an unusual experimental locomotive, the Turbomotive, which used turbines instead of cylinders.

During World War II, the Southern Railway (SR) introduced two classes of Pacific, designed by New Zealander Oliver Bulleid. These were the Merchant Navy Class and the West Country and Battle of Britain Class. These two classes continued to be built in the BR era and eventually totalled thirty Merchant Navy Class locomotives and 110 West Country and Battle of Britain Class locomotives.

The 55 BR Standard Class 7 Britannia Pacifics, introduced in 1951, were of a simple expansion two-cylinder design with Walschaerts valve gear. Their conservative design reflected a requirement for a more cost-effective, lower maintenance locomotive. Ten locomotives of a lighter version, the BR Standard Class 6, were introduced in 1952.

The final Pacific design in the United Kingdom was the BR Standard class 8 No. 71000 Duke of Gloucester, of which only one was built in 1954. It had many parts in common with the Britannias, but had three cylinders and Caprotti valve gear.

==== Tank locomotives ====
Four 4-6-2 tank locomotive designs were introduced in the United Kingdom during 1910 and 1911. Charles Bowen-Cooke of the London and North Western Railway (LNWR) introduced his Prince of Wales Tank Class in 1910. It was a tank locomotive version of his successful 4-6-0 Prince of Wales Class. 47 were built for suburban services out of Euston station.

In the same year, the NER Class Y, designed by Wilson Worsdell and later to become the LNER Class A7, was introduced by Worsdell's successor for hauling coal trains. It had been developed from the NER Class X 4-8-0T heavy shunters, later the LNER Class T1.

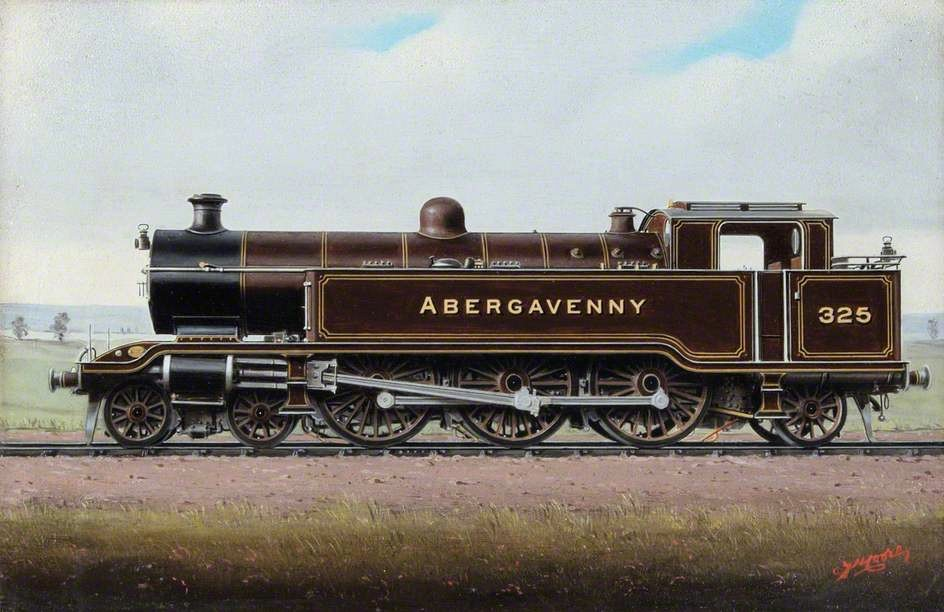
LB&SCR class J1 of 1910

Also in 1910, D. E. Marsh of the London, Brighton and South Coast Railway (LB&SCR) designed an entirely new J1 class 4-6-2T locomotive for London to Brighton express trains. Only one was built before his successor, Lawson Billinton, altered the design to create the J2 class.

The most successful and longest surviving British 4-6-2T class was the 9N class, later the LNER A5 class, of the Great Central Railway (GCR), introduced in 1911. It was designed by John G. Robinson and the last of the class survived until 1961. Four batches were built between 1911 and 1923 and a fifth batch was ordered by the LNER in 1926.

Another 4-6-2 tank class, the Caledonian Railway 944 Class Class designed by William Pickersgill, appeared in 1917 with twelve locomotives built by North British Locomotive Company. They were nicknamed the Wemyss Bay Pugs since several of the class were allocated to do the Glasgow to Wemyss Bay suburban express work. In Scotland, all tank locomotives were called Pugs, even large ones like this Caledonian Pacific class and the large Glasgow and South Western Railway 4-6-4T Baltic class.

In 1921 and 1922, Robert Urie of the London and South Western Railway (LSWR) built five H16 class 4-6-2T locomotives for short-distance transfer freight trains in the London area. These survived in service until 1962.

=== United States ===
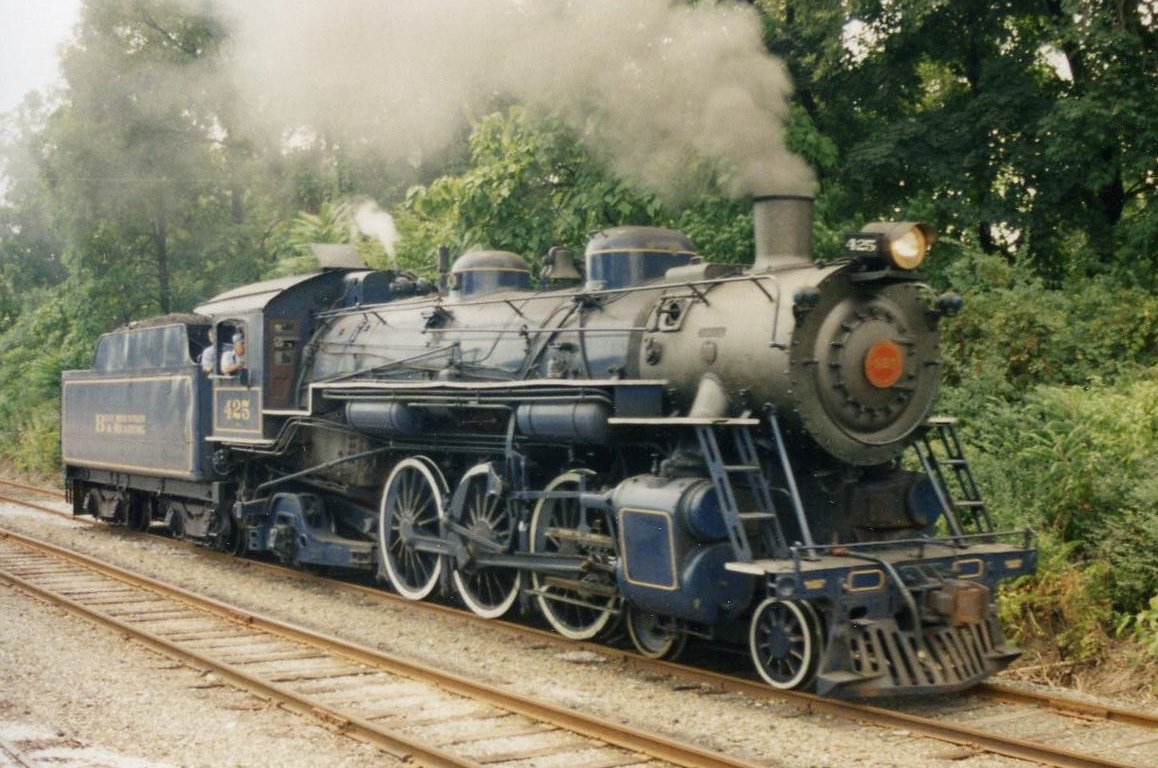
Reading Blue Mountain and Northern Railroad 425, An ex, Gulf, Mobile and Northern Railroad in 1993

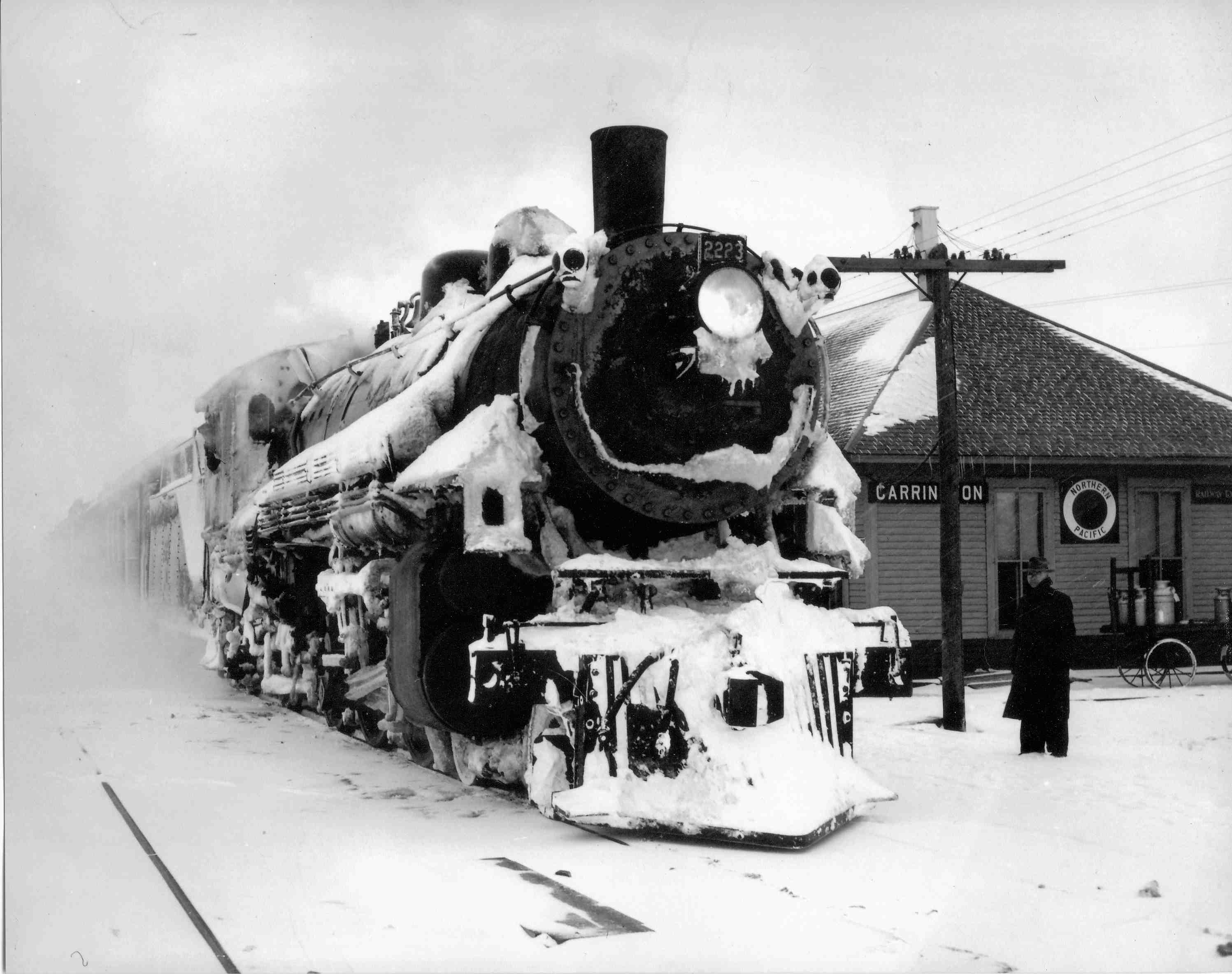
Northern Pacific Railway 4-6-2 No. 2223 stops in Carrington, N.D., in February 1948.

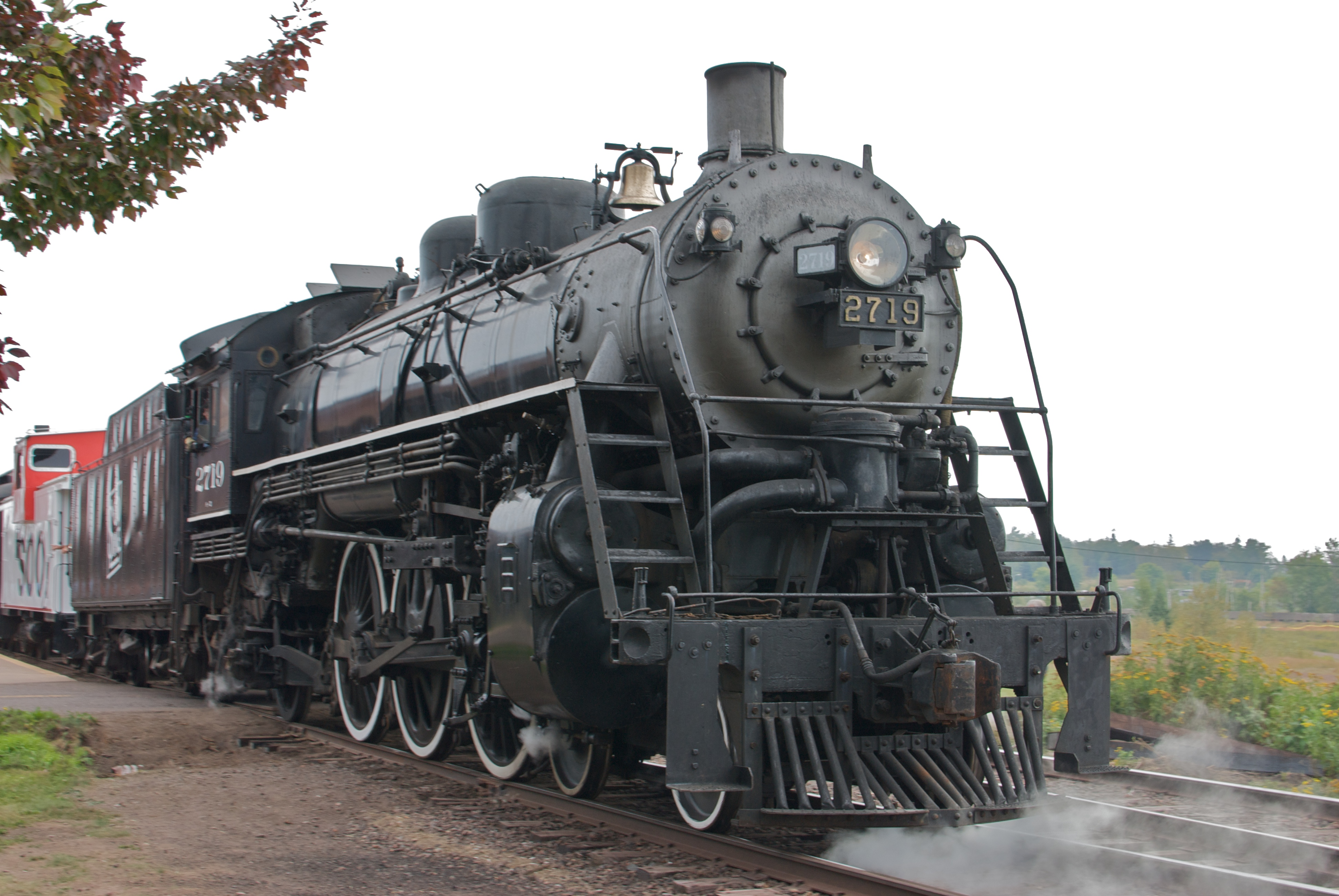
ALCO-built Soo Line 2719 at Two Harbors, Minnesota, 2009

The 4-6-2 wheel arrangement was first used in the United States in 1886. This was an unusual double-cab or Mother Hubbard type with an unusually large firebox, designed to use the waste tailings from anthracite coal mines. While this design did not become popular, the 4-6-2 was rediscovered for the same reason, to improve the 4-6-0 Ten-wheeler with a larger firebox.

With altogether 697 Pacific locomotives, the Pennsylvania Railroad (PRR) was the largest user of the type in the United States. The railroad bought its first experimental K-28 class 4-6-2 from ALCO in 1907. After testing, a further 257 Pacific locomotives in various versions, designated classes K-2, K-2a, K-2b and K-3, were built by the PRR at its Altoona Works and by ALCO and Baldwin between 1910 and 1913.

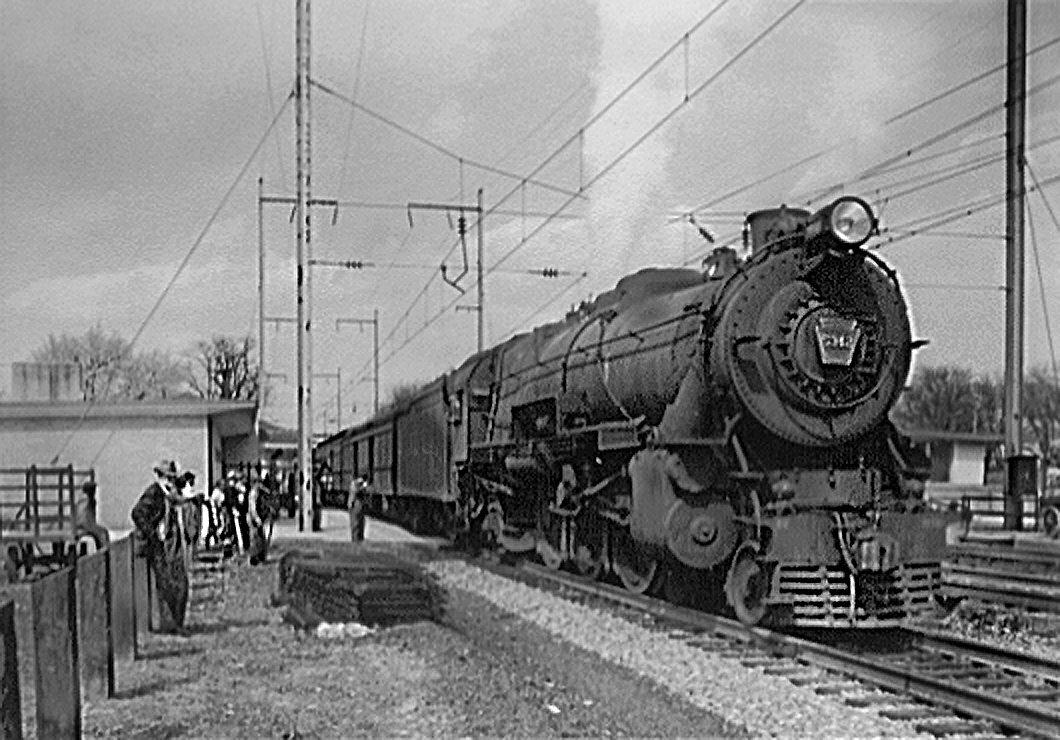
A Pennsylvania Railroad K4s

In 1911, the PRR ordered an experimental K-29 class 4-6-2 from ALCO, with a larger boiler, superheater, mechanical stoker and other innovations. A similar K4 class locomotive was built by the PRR in 1914, but no more were built until 1917. Between 1917 and 1928, the PRR built 349 K-4s locomotives and Baldwin a further 75, bringing the total of the K4s class to 425.

The last PRR Pacific locomotives were two large class K5 locomotives, built in 1929. No. 5698 was built at the PRR Altoona Works and had Walschaerts valve gear, while No. 5699 was built by Baldwin and had Caprotti valve gear. Although successful, these locomotives were not replicated, since the larger 4-8-2 Mountain types began to be introduced. No. 5698 was dropped from the roster in October 1952 and no. 5699 was retired in September 1953.

The first modern example of the type to be built for duty in the United States, was built for the Missouri Pacific in 1902, but the chief proponent of the type west of the Mississippi River was the Atchison, Topeka and Santa Fe Railway, who began buying the type the next year and ultimately owned 274. The road would have pioneered the type, if not for a belief that a two-wheeled lead truck would be sufficient for high speed passenger service. They began buying 2-6-2 Prairie types in quantity from Baldwin in 1901, with the four cylinder Vauclain compound system, a weight of 190,000 pounds (86,000 kilograms) and 79-inch-diameter (2,007 mm) coupled wheels.

When these proved insufficiently stable for high speed service, the road ordered the 1200 class of 4-6-2 Pacifics, which were two cylinder simplex engines weighing 220,000 pounds (100,000 kilograms) and fitted with 69-inch-diameter (1,753 mm) coupled wheels on unusually long axle centers. Immediately upon their arrival on the property, their drive wheels were swapped with the 79-inch-diameter (2,007 mm) drivers off the earlier Prairie types, which became fast freight locomotives. These would wind up in branch line service, where they were very successful and ultimately outlasted the Pacifics.

The Santa Fe ordered additional Pacific types of both four cylinder balanced compound and two cylinder simple types in seven classes through 1914. These gradually increased to 276,500 pounds (125,400 kilograms) and invariably rode on 73-inch (1,854 mm) drivers. The simple types tended to run conservative pressures at 170 to 175 pounds per square inch (1,170 to 1,210 kilopascals), while the compounds ran at 220 to 175 pounds per square inch (1,520 to 1,210 kilopascals). The early examples used a firebox grate of 54 square feet (5.0 m^{2}), but the last few classes had larger grates of 57.6 square feet (5.35 m^{2}). All of these were considered light Pacifics by the road, and there were a few engines of orphan classes as well. Some of these were scrapped as compounds, but most were rebuilt with two 23 1/2-by-28-inch (597 mm × 711 mm) simple cylinders and 220-pound-per-square-inch (1,500 kPa) operating pressure.

The railroad began scrapping these in 1932, but regretted it during the massive traffic of World War II. Two were semi-streamlined for a brief period during 1939. They hauled varied passenger trains and saw occasional duty in local freight and helper service. All were out of service by 1955. They initially served on the western portion of the Santa Fe system, west of La Junta, Colorado, where the line traversed the Rocky Mountains. 4-4-2 Atlantic types were generally used on the Great Plains. Later, as passenger cars grew to 85 feet (26m) in length and gained weight due to all-steel construction, Pacifics would replace the Atlantic types in the east and the western stretches would be served by new 4-8-2 Mountain and 4-8-4 Northern types.

These engines were similar to the USRA Light Pacifics introduced during World War I, but differed in certain respects. The Santa Fe, like most large United States railroads, was accustomed to custom-designing their own power and refused to buy USRA designs during the nationalization of the United States railroads under Wilson. This era, however, did allow many smaller railroads to modernize their fleets and it also saw the rise of the USRA Heavy Pacific. The Pennsylvania K-series served as a prototype for these, but they differed in important aspects such as the PRR's Belpaire fireboxes.

The Santa Fe did not buy any USRA Heavy Pacifics, either, but after the war, Baldwin began building the new and even heavier 3400 Class for the road. These were huge at 288,000 to 310,350 pounds (130,630 to 140,770 kilograms), but were otherwise a conservative design with two simple 25-by-28-inch (635 mm × 711 mm) cylinders, Walschaerts valve gear, 66.8 square feet (6.21 m^{2}) of grate and 200-pound-per-square-inch (1,400 kPa) boilers. Fifty were built by Baldwin through 1924 but, while improvements to the light Pacifics were mostly confined to simplification and other updates were only sporadically applied, all of the 3400s were built or retrofitted with feedwater heaters and all but six were to receive 79 inches (2,007 millimetres) diameter driving wheels before or during World War II. All got a pressure increase to 220 pounds per square inch (1,500 kilopascals), nine received thermic syphons, and a little experimentation was done with combustion chambers and roller bearings. Weights ultimately reached 312,000 to 326,000 pounds (142,000 to 148,000 kilograms). These, too, were mostly out of service by 1955. Six Santa Fe Pacific types survive, most of them of the heavy 3400 Class.

Most of the United States railroads which offered passenger service, used Pacific types. Except for the custom design and sheer volume of units produced, the experience of railroads in the eastern and western United States was not dissimilar to that of the Pennsylvania and Santa Fe, respectively. Some roads developed these into the Hudson (or Baltic) type 4-6-4, others preferred the versatility of the 4-8-2 Mountain and 4-8-4 Northern types, and some, like the Santa Fe, bought both. One railroad, the St. Louis-San Francisco or Frisco, actually converted a few existing Pacific types to Hudsons with larger fireboxes in their Springfield shops. The Pacific type, however, was far and away the predominant passenger service steam engine in the United States until the end of steam. Lighter streamlined cars led to a resurgence of the light Pacific, with several railroads applying streamlined shrouds to older engines. The last Pacific built for service in the United States was delivered to the Reading in 1948. Most or all Pacifics were out of regular service by 1960.

One notable 4-6-2, the Soo Line 2719 which hauled the last of the Soo Line Railroad's steam-powered trains in 1959, was preserved and was restored to operating condition for excursions. It is now on display at the Lake Superior Railroad Museum in Duluth, Minnesota.
