= 2100 class =

2100 class may refer to:

- 2100 class railcar, diesel multiple units in Adelaide, South Australia
- LT&SR 2100 Class, 4-6-4T steam locomotives
- Queensland Railways 2100 class, diesel-electric locomotives
