= 4-6-4 =

Locomotive wheel arrangement

4-6-4 (Baltic, Hudson)

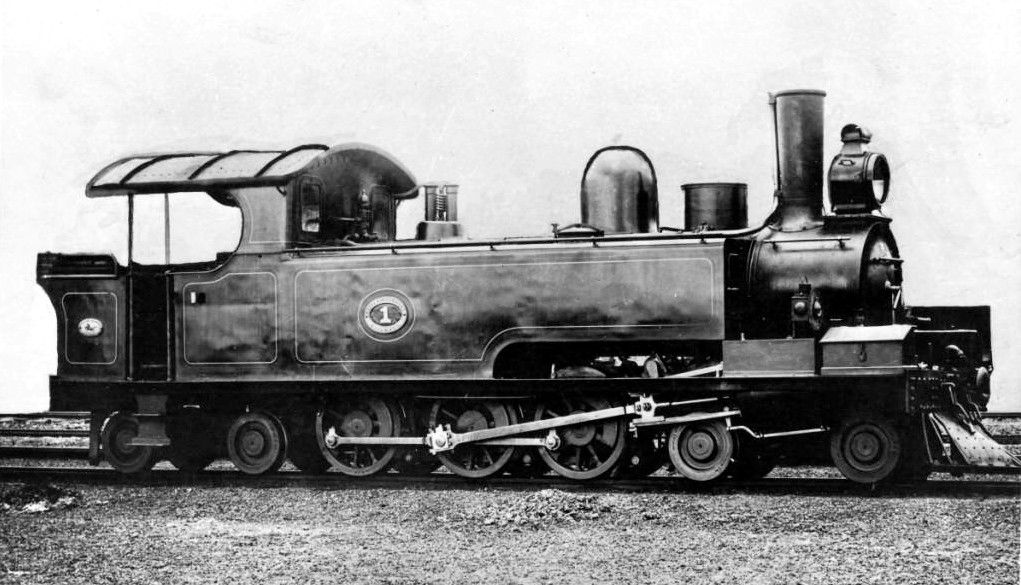
- NGR Class H 4-6-4T, SAR Class C2
Equivalent classifications
- UIC class: 2′C2′
- French class: 232
- Turkish class: 37
- Swiss class: 3/7
- Russian class: 2-3-2
First known tank engine version
- First use: 1896
- Country: Colony of Natal
- Locomotive: NGR Class H 4-6-4T
- Railway: Natal Government Railways
- Designer: George William Reid
- Builder: Natal Government Railways
- Evolved from: 4-6-0T
- Benefits: Ran equally well in either direction
First known tender engine version
- First use: 1911
- Country: France
- Locomotive: 4-cylinder compound Baltic
- Railway: Chemins de fer du Nord
- Designer: Gaston du Bousquet
- Builder: Chemins de Fer du Nord
- Evolved from: 4-6-2

4-6-4, under the Whyte notation for the classification of locomotives, represents the wheel arrangement of four leading wheels, six powered and coupled driving wheels and four trailing wheels. In France where the type was first used, it is known as the Baltic while it became known as the Hudson in most of North America.

== Overview ==
=== Tender locomotives ===
The 4-6-4 tender locomotive was first introduced in 1911 and throughout the 1920s to 1940s, the wheel arrangement was widely used in North America and to a lesser extent in the rest of the world. The type combined the basic design principles of the 4-6-2 type with an improved boiler and larger firebox that necessitated additional support at the rear of the locomotive. In general, the available tractive effort differed little from that of the 4-6-2, but the steam-raising ability was increased, giving more power at speed. The 4-6-4 was best suited to high-speed running across flat terrain. Since the type had fewer driving wheels than carrying wheels, a smaller percentage of the locomotive's weight contributed to traction, compared to other types. Like the 4-6-2, it was well suited for high speed passenger trains, but not for starting heavy freight trains and slogging on long sustained grades, where more pairs of driving wheels are better.

The first 4-6-4 tender locomotive in the world was a four-cylinder compound locomotive, designed by Gaston du Bousquet for the Chemins de fer du Nord in France in 1911. Since it was designed for the Paris-Saint Petersburg express, it was named the Baltic after the Baltic Sea, which was a logical extension of the naming convention that started with the 4-4-2 and 4-6-2.

The first 4-6-4 in the United States of America, J-1a #5200 of the New York Central Railroad, was built in 1927 to the railroad's design by the American Locomotive Company (ALCO). There, the type was named the Hudson after the Hudson River. They are also designed to pull 16-18 passenger cars in passenger service.

The world speed record for steam locomotives was held by a 4-6-4 at least twice. In 1934, the Milwaukee Road's class F6 no. 6402 reached 103.5 miles per hour (166.6 kilometres per hour) and, in 1936, the German class 05.002 reached 124.5 miles per hour (200.4 kilometres per hour). That record was broken by the British 4-6-2 number 4468 Mallard on 3 July 1938, when it reached 126 miles per hour (203 kilometres per hour), still the world speed record for steam traction.

=== Tank locomotives ===
The 4-6-4T was also a fairly common wheel arrangement for passenger tank locomotives. As such, it was essentially the tank locomotive equivalent of a 4-6-0 tender locomotive, with water tanks and a coal bunker supported by four trailing wheels instead of in a tender. In New Zealand, some 4-6-4T locomotives (the Wab class) were tank versions of 4-6-2 locomotives (of the Ab class).

The first known 4-6-4 tank locomotive was rebuilt from a Natal Government Railways (NGR) K&S Class 4-6-0T which was modified in 1896 to enable it to run equally well in either direction on the Natal South Coast line, where no turning facilities were available at the time. This sole locomotive later became the Class C2 on the South African Railways (SAR). The first known locomotive class to be designed with a 4-6-4T wheel arrangement, the NGR's Class F tank locomotive, was based on this modified locomotive and built by Neilson, Reid & Company in 1902. These became the Class E on the SAR in 1912.

One streamlined 4-6-4T was built for the Deutsche Reichsbahn in 1935.

== Use ==
=== Australia ===
Tender locomotives

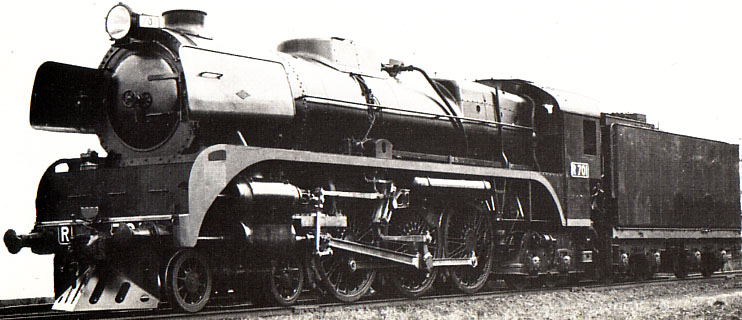
Victorian Railways R class

Seventy R class 4-6-4 tender locomotives, the only class of this configuration in Australia and built by North British Locomotive Company, were introduced by the Victorian Railways in 1951 for mainline express passenger operations. However, the introduction in 1952 of the B class diesel-electric locomotives saw the R class almost immediately being relegated to secondary passenger and freight use, with many being staged at depots around the state. A number were preserved and some of these continued to operate on special excursion trains.

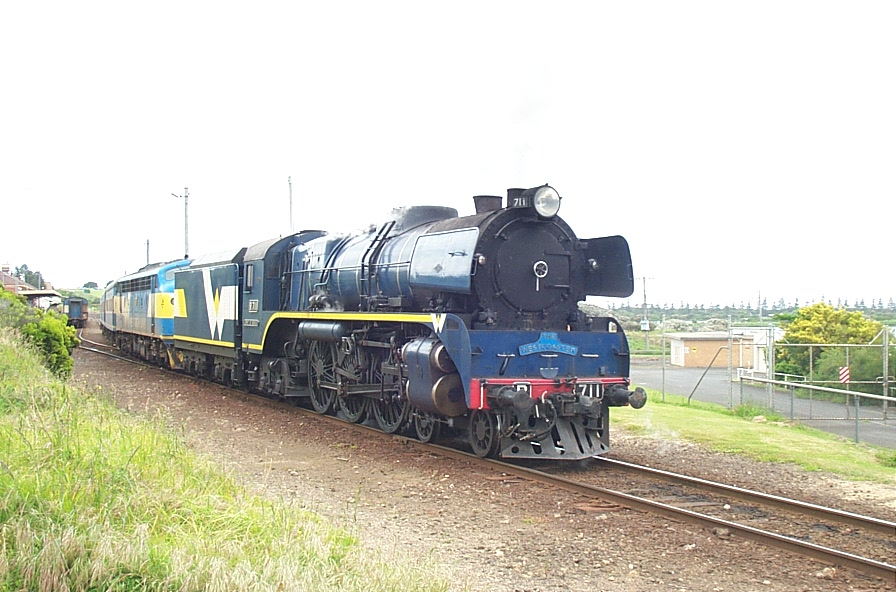
West Coast Railway R class 711

With the privatisation of regional passenger operations in Victoria in the mid-1990s, two R class locomotives were brought back into normal revenue service by the West Coast Railway, for regularly scheduled mainline passenger trains between Melbourne and Warrnambool. The locomotives underwent a number of modifications to allow for reliable high speed operation, including dual Lempor exhausts, oil firing and the addition of a diesel control stand for multiple unit operation. The use of these R class locomotives ceased after the demise of the private operator in 2004.

Tank locomotives

The 4-6-4 tank locomotive configuration was a popular type with the Western Australian Government Railways. The D class was introduced for suburban passenger service in 1912. Its successors, both also of the 4-6-4T wheel arrangement, were the Dm class of 1945 that was rebuilt from older E class 4-6-2 tender locomotives, and the Dd class of 1946.

The New South Wales Government Railways 30 Class 4-6-4T locomotives were used on Sydney and Newcastle suburban passenger train workings from 1903 until the end of steam operations in the 1970s. No. 3046 is preserved at the Dorrigo Steam Railway & Museum. No. 3013 is stored, dismantled at the Canberra Railway Museum. 3085 is awaiting restoration at Goulburn Roundhouse. 3112 operated tour trains for a number of years but is currently out of service in Canberra. 3137 saw regular use in the 1970s and 1980s as part of the NSW Rail Museum operating fleet, but is out of service and now on static display at Thirlmere.

=== Canada ===
Tender locomotives

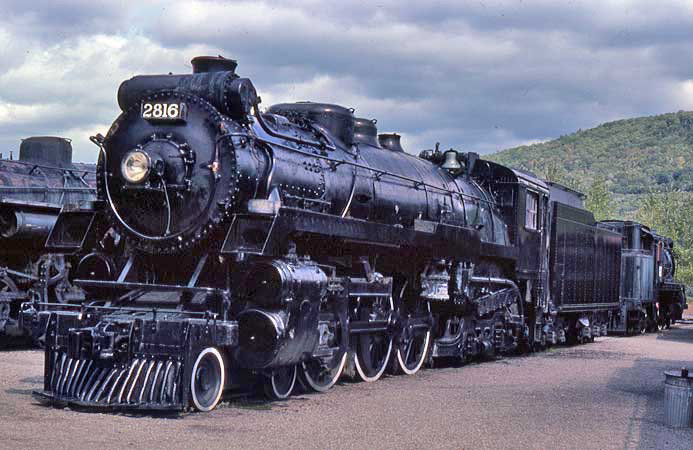
Canadian Pacific 2816 at Steamtown, U.S.A. in Vermont

The second-largest user of the 4-6-4 type in North America was the Canadian Pacific with 65 H1a to H1e class locomotives, numbered 2800 to 2864 and built by Montreal Locomotive Works (MLW) between 1929 and 1940. They were highly successful and improved service and journey times on the CPR's transcontinental routes. The third and later batches of CPR Hudsons, H1c to H1e numbers 2820 to 2864, were dubbed Royal Hudsons and were semi-streamlined. Royal permission was given for these locomotives to bear the royal crown and arms after locomotive No. 2850 hauled King George VI across Canada in 1939.

Five CPR Hudsons survived. H1b class no. 2816 Empress is the sole remaining unstreamlined CPR Hudson. It was repatriated from static display at Steamtown in Scranton, Pennsylvania, to the CPR in 1998 and was restored and converted to oil-burning to haul excursions for CPR. The other four remaining H1 class locomotives are all Royal Hudsons. As of 2010, the four Royal Hudsonswere on display in museums, No. 2839 in California, No. 2850 in Quebec, No. 2858 in Ontario, and No. 2860 – the first oil-burning Royal Hudson of the class – in British Columbia. By 2008, the CPR Hudsons were the only operational Hudsons in North America. (Also see North American production list)

Tank locomotives

The Grand Trunk Railway (GTR) had six K2 class 4-6-4T locomotives, built in September 1914 by MLW and acquired for suburban service. Numbered 1540 to 1545 on the GTR, they were reclassified as X-10-a and renumbered 45 to 50 after being absorbed by the Canadian National (CN) in 1923. Three of them are preserved, numbers GT 1541 (CN 46) in Vallee-Jonction, QC, GT 1542 (CN 47) at the Steamtown National Historic Site in Scranton, Pennsylvania, and GT 1544 (CN 49) at the Canadian Railway Museum in Delson, Quebec. (Also see North American production list)

=== Finland ===
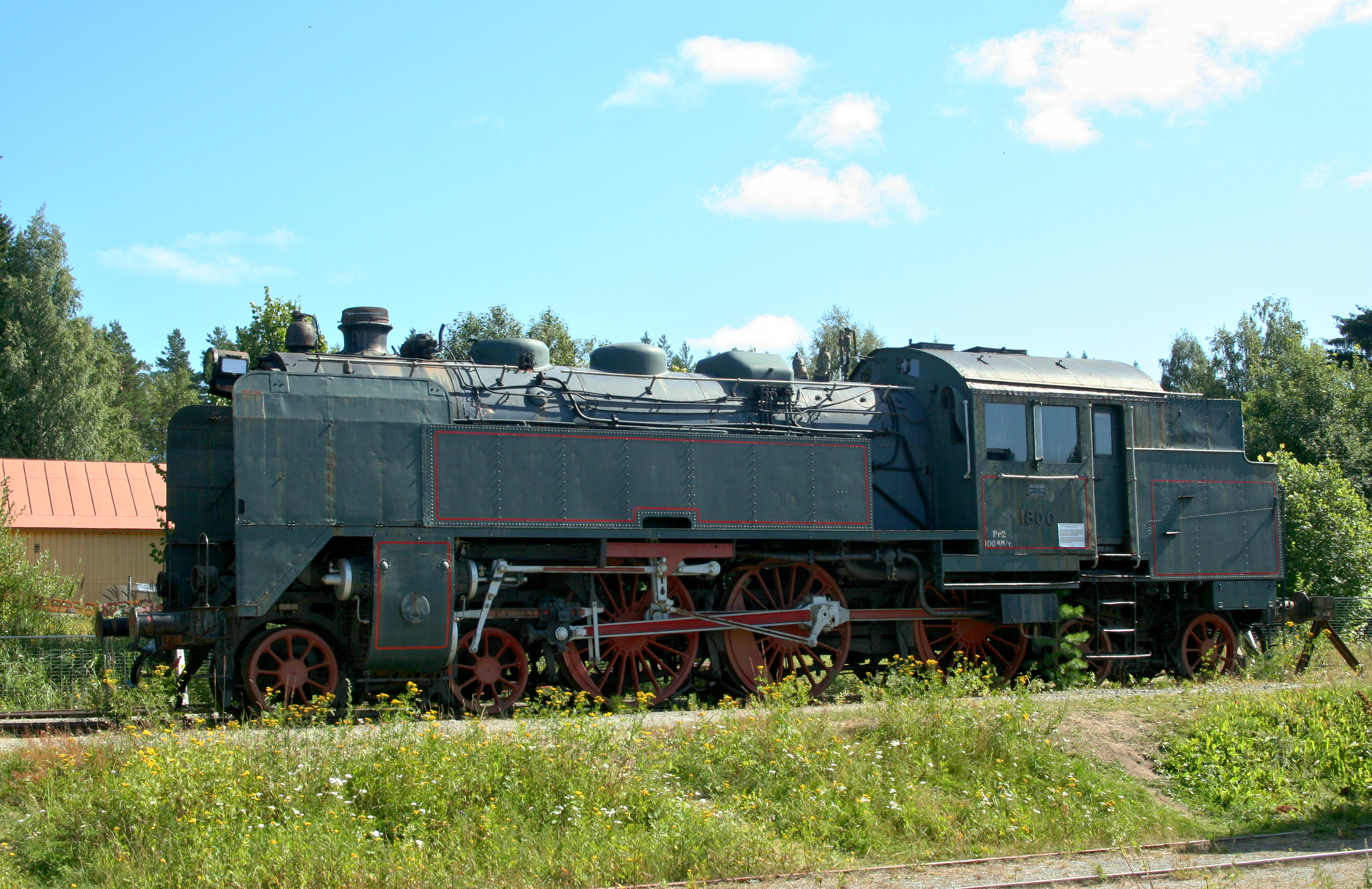
Finnish VR Class Pr2 no. 1800 at Haapamäki in Keuruu, Finland

The Finnish State Railways Class Pr2, nicknamed Henschel, was a 5 ft (1,524 mm) gauge passenger tank locomotive class, ordered from Henschel & Son by the Estonian State Railways in the spring of 1939 and completed in 1941. The outbreak of the Second World War prevented their delivery to Estonia, but a few of these engines did operate in Latvia in 1942. They became superfluous when the Germans began converting the Baltic tracks to 4 ft 8 1/2 in (1,435 mm) standard gauge, and the four locomotives were sold to Finland. They were classified Pr2 and numbered 1800 to 1803 upon their arrival in Finland in December 1942.

The Class Pr2 tanks were quite advanced locomotives and were based on the Henschel-built DRG Class 62 tank engine design of 1928 for the Deutsche Reichsbahn. After their initial teething problems were solved, they proved to be fast runners and an ideal addition to the motive power stable. They were originally built as oil-burners and reverted to this type of fuel between 1947 and 1954, when oil prices were low. With its 1,830 millimetres (72 inches) coupled wheels, it was very fast and one of them achieved 144 kilometres per hour (89 miles per hour) during a test run. No. 1803, the last Class Pr2 in service, was withdrawn in May 1960. Only no. 1800 has been preserved.

=== France ===
The four-cylinder 4-6-4 compound locomotive designed by Gaston du Bousquet for the French Chemins de fer du Nord, of which two (3.1101 and 3.1102) were built at the company's workshops in 1911, was the first tender locomotive in the world with this wheel arrangement. Named the Baltic since it was intended for service on the Paris-Saint Petersburg express, its most remarkable feature was the en echelon arrangement of the two low-pressure inside cylinders in order to accommodate the very large bore. One of them was built with a water-tube firebox. Although they were not multiplied, they were the forerunners of the highly successful 4-6-2 Nord Pacifics and Super-Pacifics. One survives in the Cité du Train at Mulhouse in eastern France, cut up in sectioned form to display its interior during the World Exhibition in Paris in 1937. Its tender was not preserved.

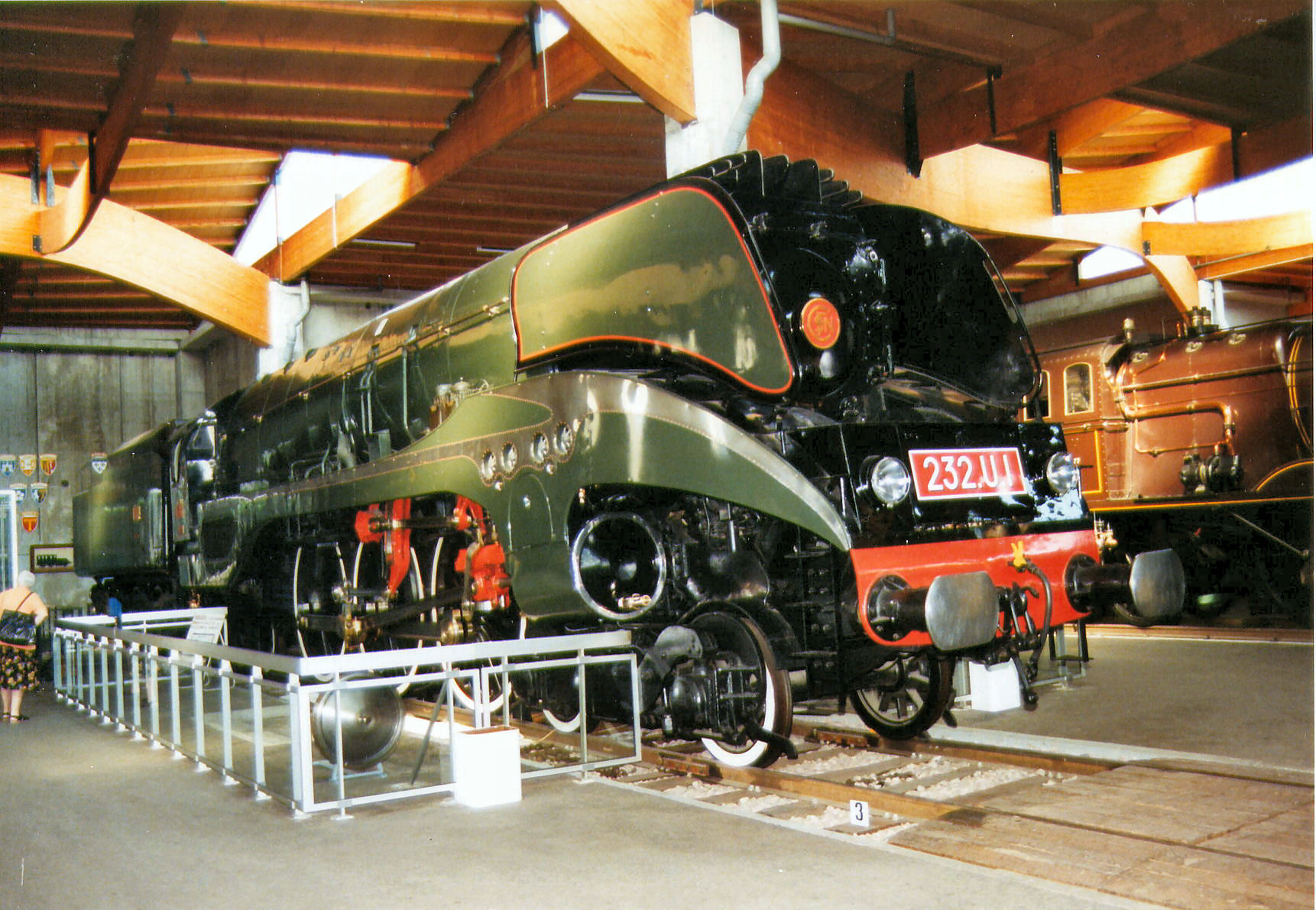
SNCF 232.U.1 class in the Cité du Train

France also produced some of the last Baltic locomotives. In 1938, Marc de Caso, the last Chief Mechanical Engineer of the Nord, originated the construction of eight Baltic locomotives, all delivered to the newly established SNCF. Of these eight, three were 232.R class three-cylinder simple expansion (simplex) locomotives with rotary cam poppet valve gear, while four were 232.S class four-cylinder compound locomotives, initially also with poppet valve gear that was later replaced by Walschaerts valve gear driving oscillating cams. Built for comparative purposes, it was found that the compounds outperformed the simples.

The eighth of the class, the final French Baltic type, was completed in 1949 as the 232.U.1 class. This was another four-cylinder compound with Walschaerts valve gear, but with very large and light piston valves, that proved capable of more than 4,000 indicated horsepower (3,000 kilowatts). This locomotive is also preserved at Mulhouse. (Also see Netherlands)

=== Germany ===
Tender locomotives

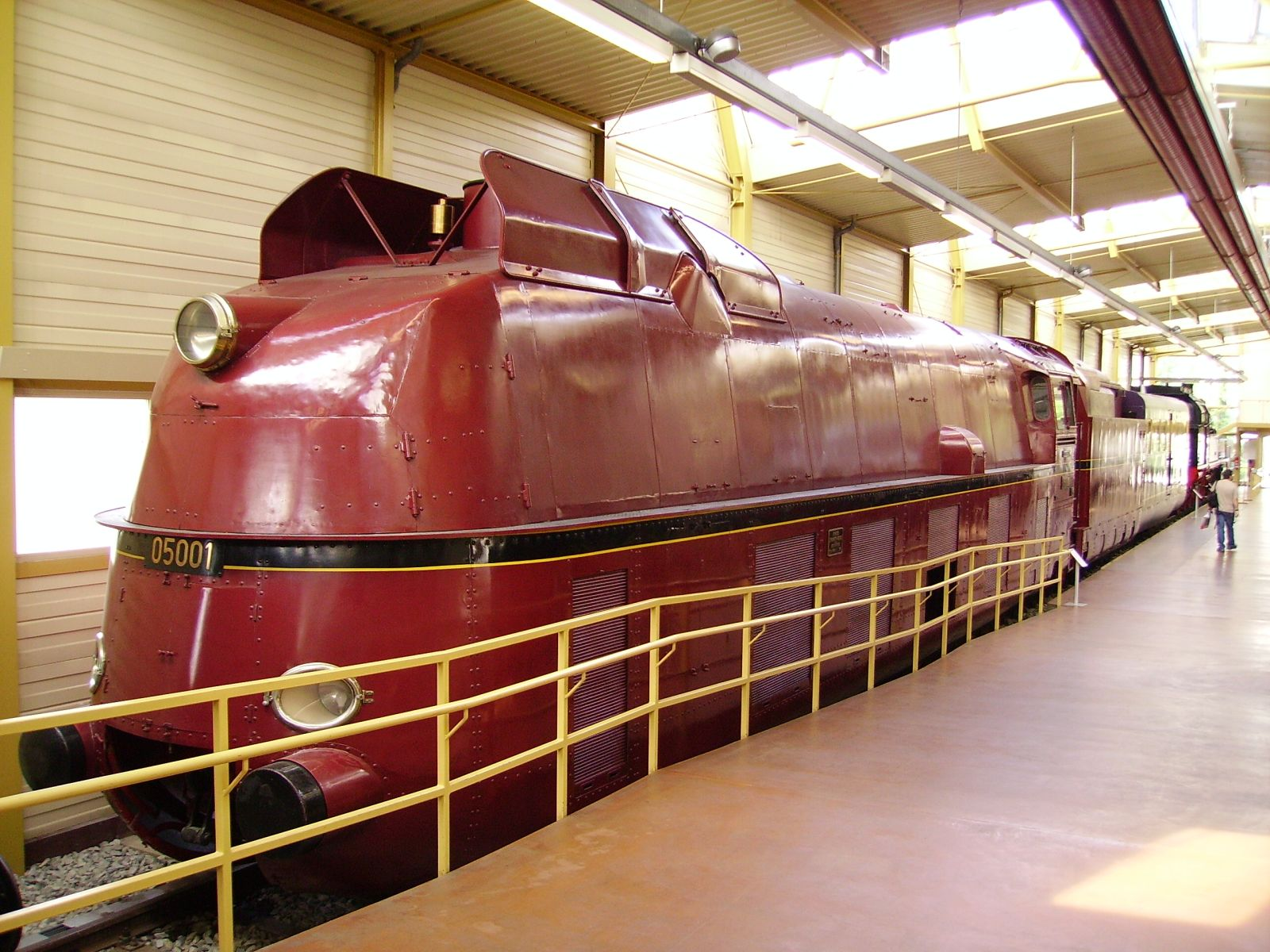
05.001 in the Nuremberg Transport Museum

Three 4-6-4 tender locomotives were built for the Deutsche Reichsbahn (DRG) by August Borsig in 1935. Designated Class 05, they were designed for high speed running. They were three-cylinder locomotives with giant 90 1/2 inches (2,299 millimetres) driving wheels and powerful clasp brakes on all wheels.

The first two locomotives were conventional locomotives, but the third was built as a cab forward and burned pulverised coal. All three were built streamlined, in shrouds that covered the locomotives almost to the railhead. On 11 May 1936, the 05.002 set a world speed record of 124.5 miles per hour (200.4 kilometres per hour) that was bettered by the British 4-6-2 Mallard two years later, on 3 July 1938. The 05.003 was converted to conventional boiler-forward running in 1944.

All three survived the Second World War and were rebuilt as conventional non-streamlined locomotives in 1950, with new boilers. They worked in this form until 1957, when electric locomotives took over on the high-speed routes. The first locomotive, 05.001, was restored to its original streamlined configuration in 1961, for display in the Nuremberg Transport Museum.

Tank locomotives

A number of German 4-6-4T locomotive classes were built, the best known being the Prussian T 18 class of 1912. Altogether 534 of them were built by the Stettiner Maschinenbau AG Vulcan and Henschel & Son between 1912 and 1927. Of these, 458 went to the Prussian state railways and subsequently the Deutsche Reichsbahn, where they became the DRG Class 78.

=== India ===
There were two classes of 4-6-4 tender locomotives in India, both early in the history of the wheel arrangement and also of unusually narrow gauge. The nine G class locomotives of the 2 ft 6 in (762 mm) gauge Barsi Light Railway in western India were built by Nasmyth, Wilson & Company in 1928 and 1930 and by WG Bagnall in 1939. The four ND class locomotives of the 2 ft (610 mm) gauge Scindia State Railway in Gwalior were built in 1928 by Kerr, Stuart & Company.

=== Indonesia ===
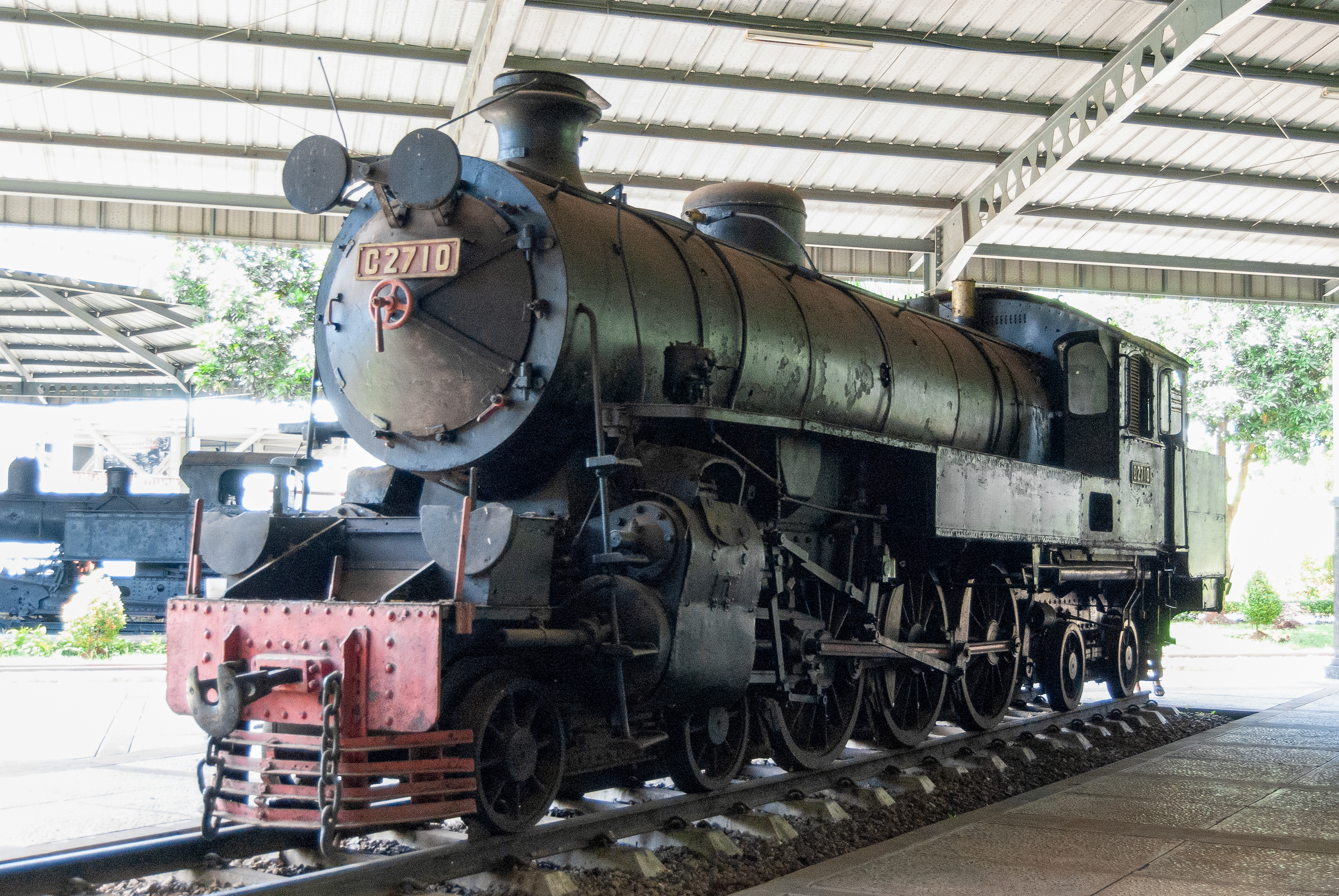
The SS1100 or DKA/PNKA C27

Java Staatsspoorwegen as state-owned railways in Dutch East Indies ordered 39 units of 4-6-4T for the need of increasing traffic of express trains, manufactured by Swiss Locomotive and Machine Works (SLM), Switzerland, Armstrong Whitworth, UK and Werkspoor, Netherlands and soon classified as SS Class 1100 (SS 1101–1139) which were came in 1919–1920. The class was designed to meet the requirement to haul trains of 400 tons at a speed of 50 kilometres per hour (31 miles per hour) on a 0.5% incline with 180 metres (590 feet) radius curves and must be able to turn corners with a radius of 120 metres and a speed of 80 kilometres per hour (50 miles per hour). These SS 1100s were initially made to work the express interurban train which connecting Surabaya–Malang and could achieve its speeds at 100 kilometres per hour (62 miles per hour). The SS 1100s were superseded by more fast and reliable SS 1300s in 1921. As an alternative, several SS 1100s were made to work the East Java Express trains, working in tandem with the 2-8-0 SS Class 900 (D50) providing 5 hours travel between Surabaya and Banyuwangi. After Japanese occupation and Indonesian Independence they renumbered to C27 class. Of the 39 built, two are preserved as static exhibits at the Ambarawa Railway Museum and the Transportation Museum of Taman Mini Indonesia Indah.

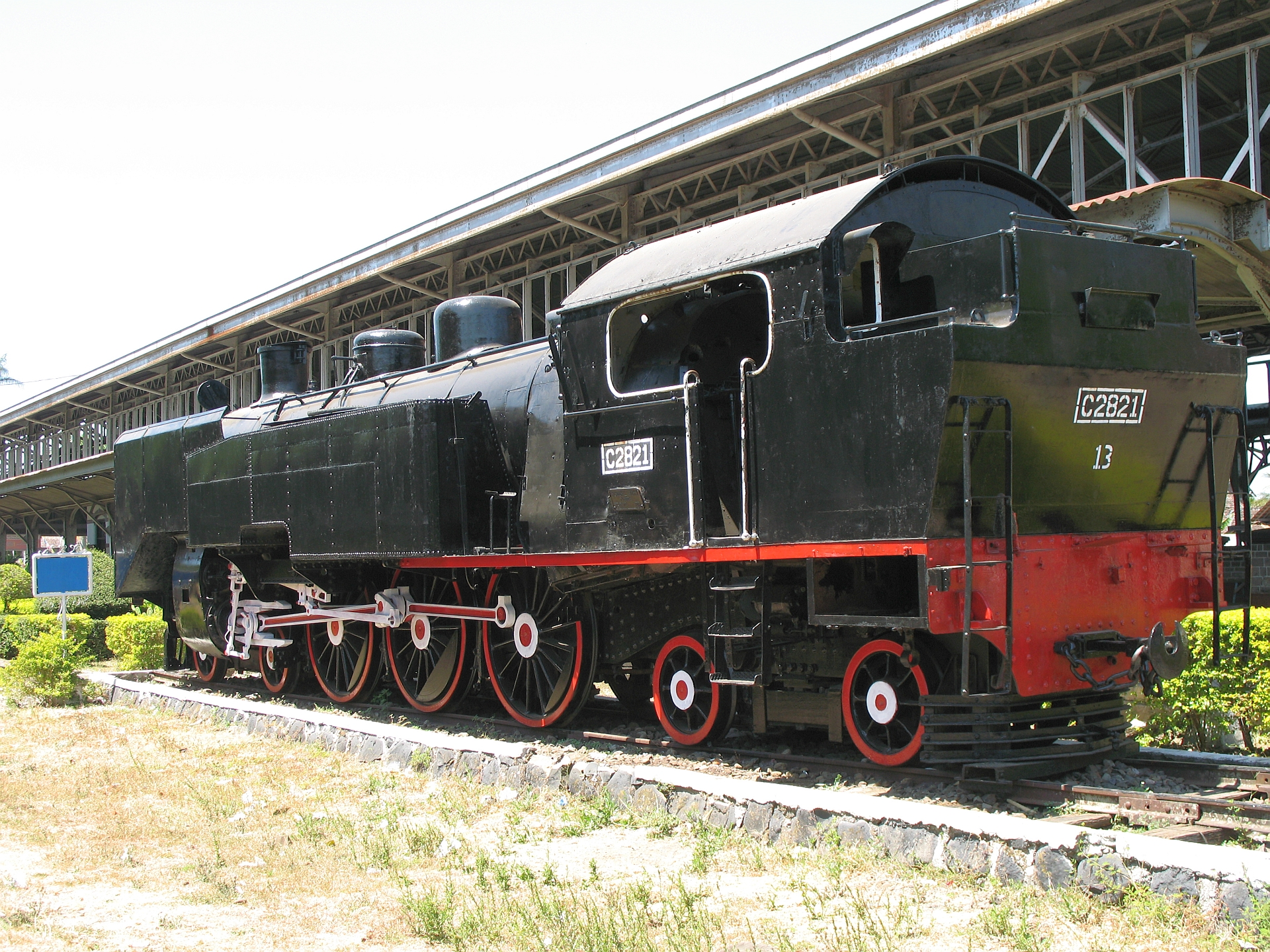
the SS1300 or DKA/PNKA C28 with smoke deflector preserved at Ambarawa Railway Museum

By 1921, 58 units of new express 4-6-4T locomotives were built for the Java Staatsspoorwegen from 3 German builders (Henschel & Son, Sächsische Maschinenfabrik and Maschinenfabrik Esslingen) with specifications could haul some series of trains at speeds of 90 kilometres per hour (56 miles per hour) on flat line and 45 kilometres per hour (28 miles per hour) on incline, they were classified as SS Class 1300 (1301-1358). During some tests, the power output jumped to 1,000 horsepower (hp) from its design which only 900 horsepower. SS 1300s could easily driven at speeds of 100 kilometres per hour (62 miles per hour) on flat routes and 55 kilometres per hour (34 miles per hour) on inclines. It was declared the world's fastest steam locomotive on 3 ft 6 in (1,067 mm) gauge when the drivers could spur locomotives up to 110 kilometres per hour (68 miles per hour) and used to haul some express trains like Eendaagsche and Java Nacht on Batavia (Weltevreden)–Surabaya line, Vlugge Vier on Batavia (Weltevreden)–Bandung line and Vlugge Vijf on Surabaya–Malang line. After Japanese occupation and Indonesian Independence, they renumbered as C28 class. The C28s were one of the most popular in Indonesia especially for the drivers, beside achieving speeds of up to 95 kilometres per hour (59 miles per hour), they were reliable and also easy to maintain. One of the C28 class number 35 was also modified to tender locomotive (4-6-4) on Cepu line which carried out by Djawatan Kereta Api (DKA) or The Department of Railway of the Republic of Indonesia for presidential train. This modification was actually part of a plan carried out by SS since 1930s to modified their 4-6-4 tank engines to tender one using tenders from the scrapped Bull Moose Alco 2-8-8-0 SS Class 1200 (DKA DD50) to extend their operational range when hauled the express trains but it was cancelled due to Great Depression and Second World War. But unfortunately, the modified tank-tender locomotive was also scrapped in the end of steam ages in Indonesia.

=== Ireland ===
The first and longest-lived Baltics in Ireland were two locomotives, built by Nasmyth, Wilson in 1904 for the narrow-gauge County Donegal Railways. Both were later superheated and one lasted until 1967, albeit derelict.

=== Japan ===
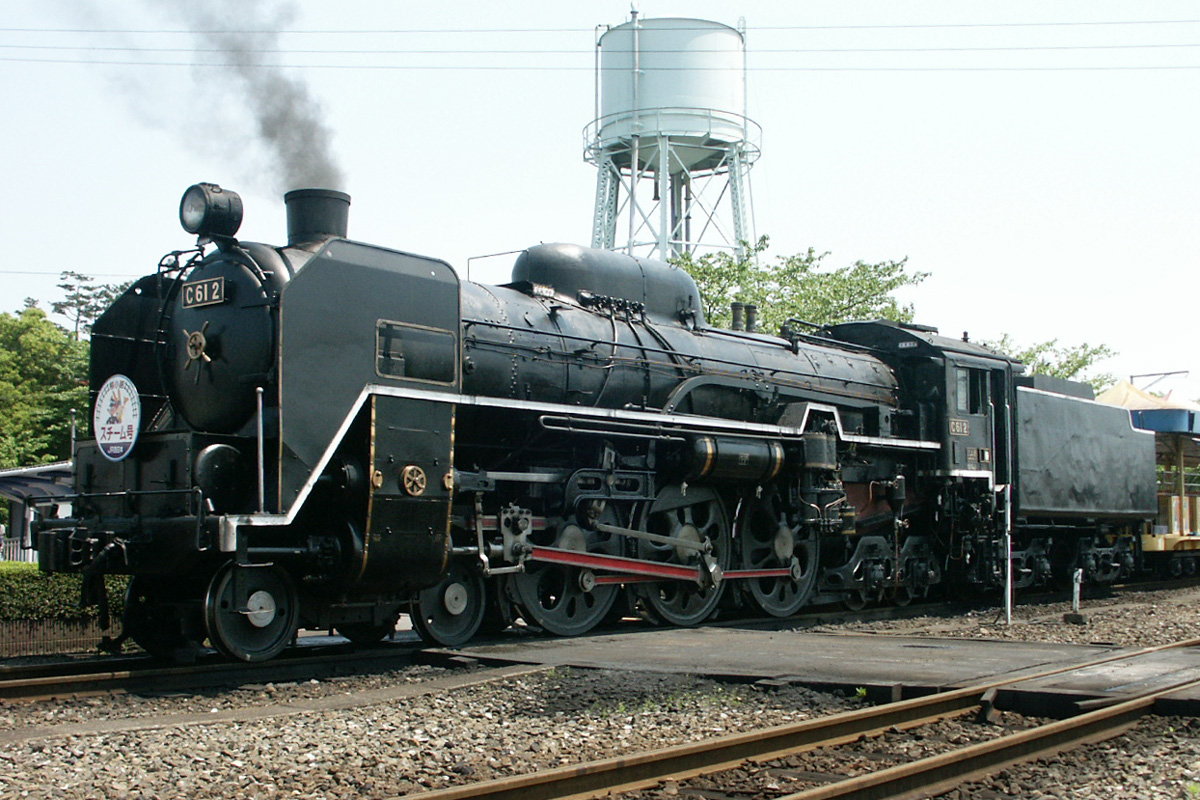
Japanese Class C61.2 at the Umekoji Museum

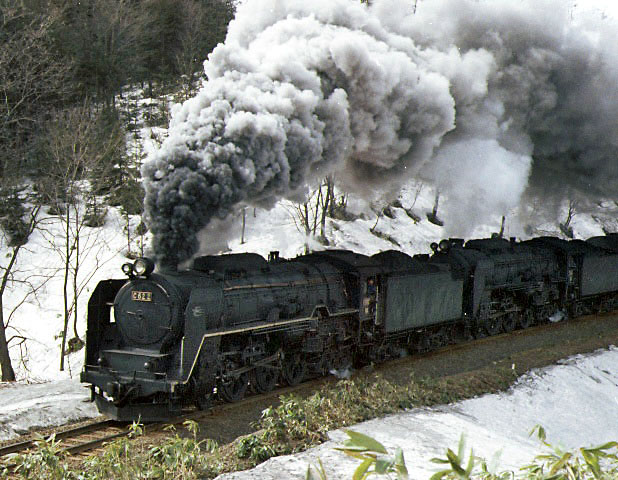
JNR C62 2 Steam loco in March 1971

Between 1947 and 1961, the Japanese National Railways built three classes of rather advanced American-style 3 ft 6 in (1,067 mm) gauge Hudson tender locomotives.

- Between 1947 and 1949, 33 Class C61 locomotives were rebuilt from former Class D51 2-8-2 Mikado freight locomotives. The Class C61 was the first Japanese locomotive with the 4-6-4 Hudson wheel arrangement.
- In 1948 and 1949, 49 Class C62 locomotives were built with new 4-6-4 frames and using the boilers of Class D52 2-8-2 Mikado locomotives. These were the largest and fastest steam passenger locomotives to run in Japan.
- Between 1953 and 1961, 47 Class C60 locomotives were rebuilt from surplus Class C59 4-6-2 Pacific locomotives at the Hamamatsu and Kōriyama factories.

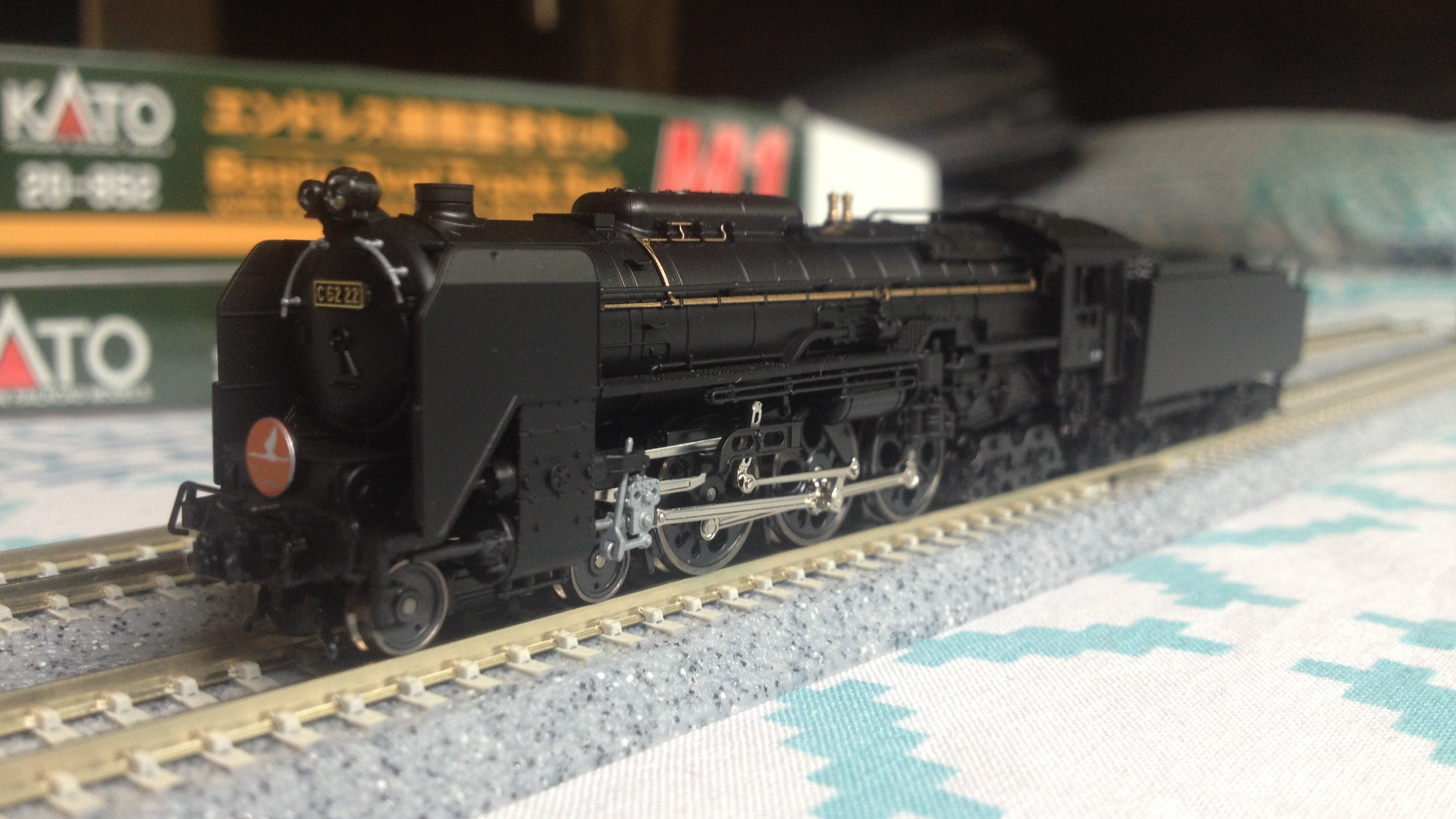
An N-scale model of the 4-6-4 C62 steam locomotive, made by Kato Precision Railroad Models

The Class C60 and Class C61 were smaller locomotives than the Class C62, which filled the tight Japanese loading gauge. They were equipped with Boxpok driving wheels and used several American-style appliances, even though they had British-style smokebox doors.

=== Malaysia ===
The Federated Malay States Railways (FMSR, predecessor to the Malayan Railway (MR), and presently, Keretapi Tanah Melayu (KTM)) operated 17 locomotives of the 4-6-4T type as their class C. Four batches in all made up the class, with the first batch of five (class C^{1}) being delivered by Nasmyth Wilson in 1930. Three more batches consisting of six, and two individual batches of five were ordered from the North British Locomotive Company (NBL) in 1939 (class C^{2}), 1940 (class C^{3}), and 1942, but the last batch of five was sent to the Middle East for use by the War Department (WD) since the Japanese had already occupied Malaya. Ultimately, the last batch would end up with the Jordan Hejaz Railway (JHR).

The preexisting C class locomotives on the FMSR were reclassified as the 401, 402, and 403 class locomotives (formerly classes C^{1}, C^{2} and C^{3}) in 1946. The 401s were the first of the FMSR C class tanks to finish its service, while the latter batches were still in service around the 1960s. None survive today; all engines of this class were scrapped.

=== Netherlands ===
The Dutch Railways ordered six 4-6-4T passenger locomotives from Beyer, Peacock & Company in 1913. A follow-up order for 34 locomotives was only partly delivered when, due to the downturn in traffic caused by World War I, the Dutch authorities cancelled the remainder of the order. The 40 locomotives as ordered were originally to be numbered 1201 to 1240, but the 26 that were delivered were later renumbered 6001 to 6026.

The 14 undelivered locomotives were sold to the British War Department for use on the Western Front, where air-braked passenger locomotives were in short supply. They were assigned Railway Operating Division (ROD) numbers 1 to 12, 14 and 15 and were used on ambulance and troop trains as well as civilian passenger trains in the British sector.

After the war, they were sold to the Chemins de fer du Nord in France, who numbered them 3.871 to 3.884. In 1938, all 14 passed on to the SNCF, who renumbered them 232.TB.1 to 232.TB.14. Two were withdrawn in 1946, but the rest remained in service until 1950–1951. They were outlived by their Dutch sister locomotives, of which twenty were still in service in 1952. (Also see France)

There were also ten four-cylinder 6100 class locomotives, built in 1929 by Hohenzollern and Werkspoor and based on the 3700 4-6-0 class. The last two were withdrawn in 1958.

=== Philippines ===
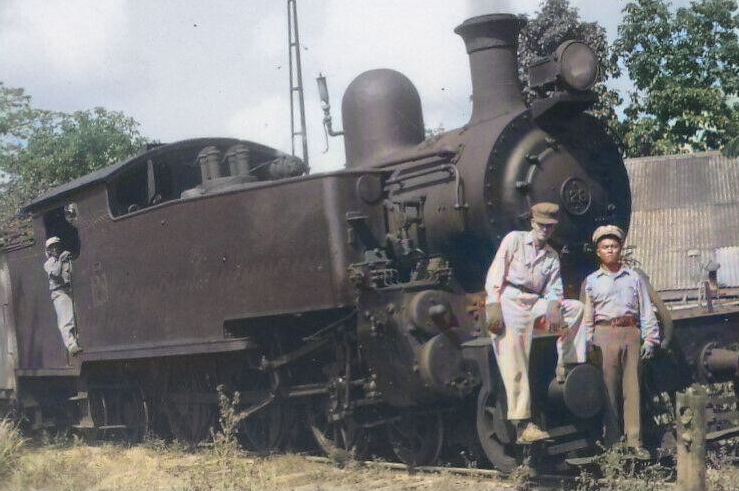
Manila Railroad 128 at the Calamba Sugar Estate in 1946.

There were two 4-6-4 tank locomotives built by the North British Locomotive Company as an extension of the original 120 class for the Manila Railroad Company built in 1910. Numbered Manila Railroad 127 and 128, the two locomotives were based in Tarlac City yards. No. 128 remained in service with the Manila Railroad by 1946 on the Canlubang branch line, and were scrapped before 1952.

The original Manila Railroad 160 class was also assigned to an order of seven 4-6-4T types also built by NBL in 1914. However, due to World War I hampering the transfer of British equipment to Asia, the 4-6-4s were instead given to South Africa. The 160 class numbering was later given to four 2-6-0+0-6-2 Kitson Meyer locomotives known as the Manila Railroad 160 class.

=== South Africa ===
No 4-6-4 tender locomotives saw service in South Africa, but six 4-6-4T tank locomotive classes were used, all of them on 3 ft 6 in (1,067 mm) Cape gauge.

In 1896, the Natal Government Railways (NGR) rebuilt one of its Class K&S 4-6-0 tank locomotives to a 4-6-4T configuration, as directed by NGR Locomotive Superintendent George William Reid. This was the first known use of this wheel arrangement and was done to enable the locomotive to run equally well in either direction in shuttle service on the Natal South Coast line, where no turning facilities were available. In 1912, when it was assimilated into the South African Railways (SAR), this locomotive was designated Class C2.

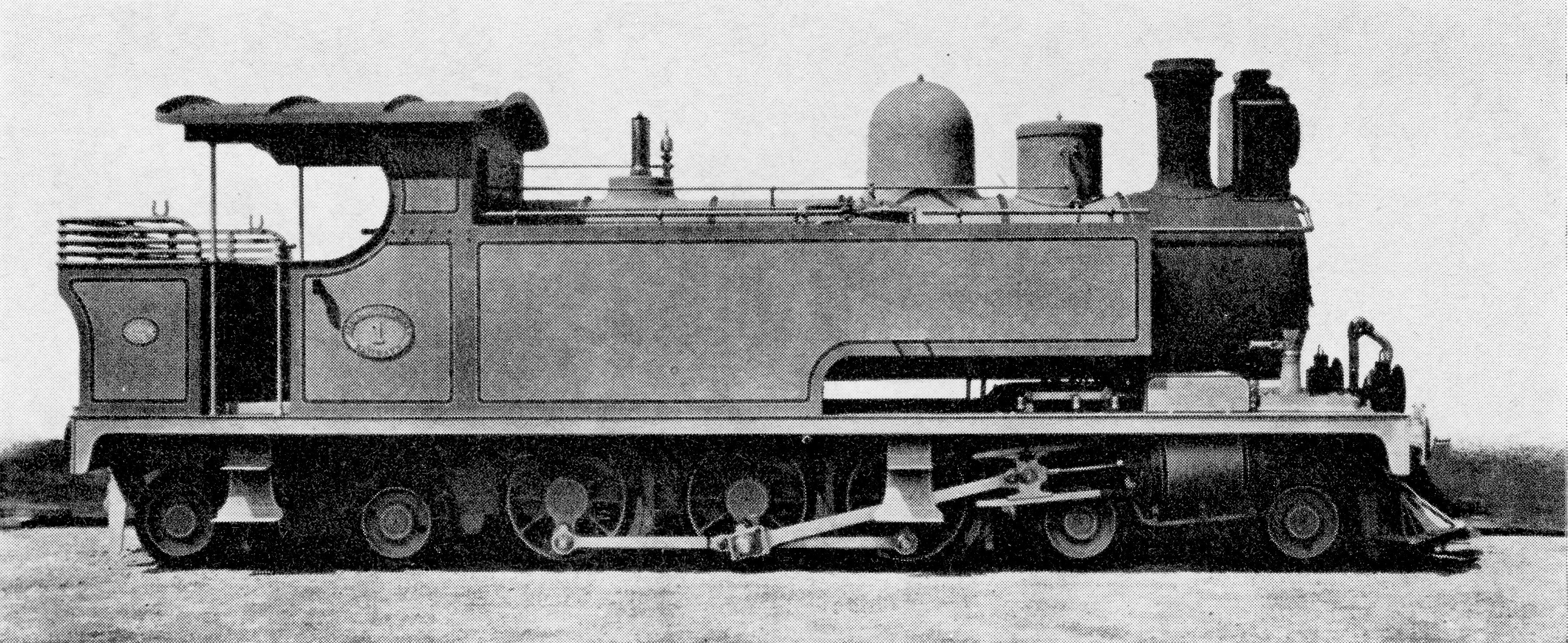
NGR Class F, SAR Class E

Ten tank locomotives, designed by G.W. Reid, were built for the NGR by Neilson, Reid & Company in 1902. It was the first known locomotive in the world to be designed and built as a 4-6-4 Baltic type. Known as the Neilson, Reid locomotives until they were designated the NGR's Class F, they were larger versions of the rebuilt Class H locomotive of 1896 and many of the main dimensions were identical. It had a plate frame, Stephenson valve gear and used saturated steam. In 1912 they became the Class E on the SAR.

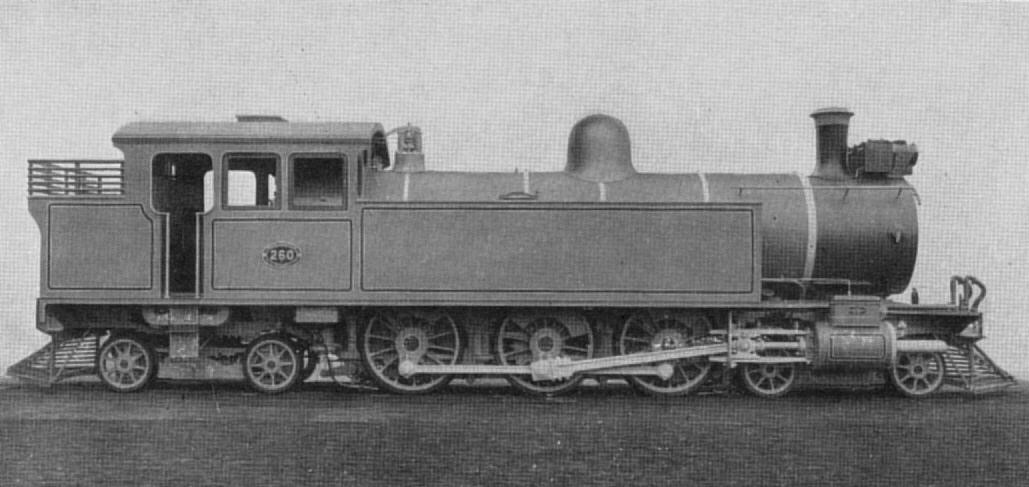
CSAR Class F no. 260, SAR no. 78

Eight Class F tank locomotives were placed in service on the Central South African Railways (CSAR) in 1904, designed by CSAR Chief Locomotive Superintendent P.A. Hyde and built by Vulcan Foundry. It had a bar frame, Stephenson valve gear and used saturated steam, and was acquired for the suburban services between Springs and Randfontein. The double red lining on their black livery and polished copper-capped chimneys, brass domes and boiler bands earned them the nickname Chocolate Boxes. These locomotives retained their Class F classification on the SAR.

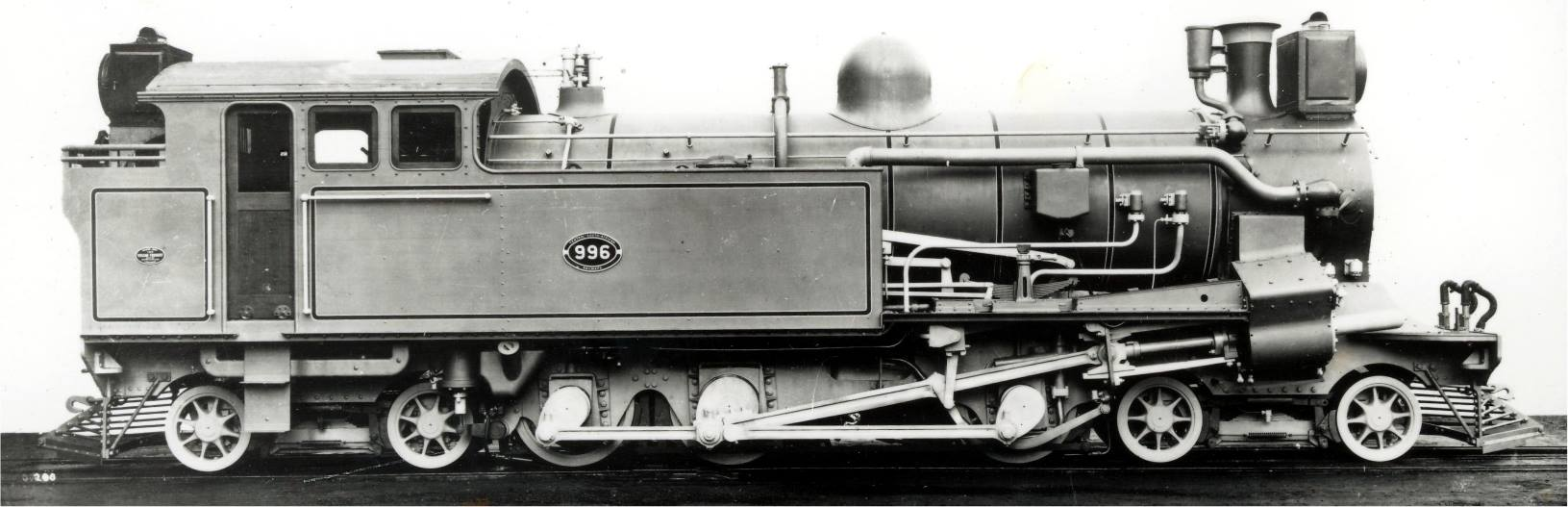
CSAR rack tank

In 1905, two rack tank locomotives were built for the CSAR by Vulcan Foundry, for use on the steep rack section between Waterval Onder and Waterval Boven on the line to Mozambique. Designed as two-cylinder locomotives by Hyde, the design was modified by the builders to four cylinders with the inside cylinders driving the rack equipment, but without a compensating increase in boiler capacity. The locomotives were failures on the rack section, their rack equipment was removed within a year of entering service and they were reassigned to shunting duty. In 1912, they were considered obsolete by the SAR and not classified, but they remained in service until 1915.

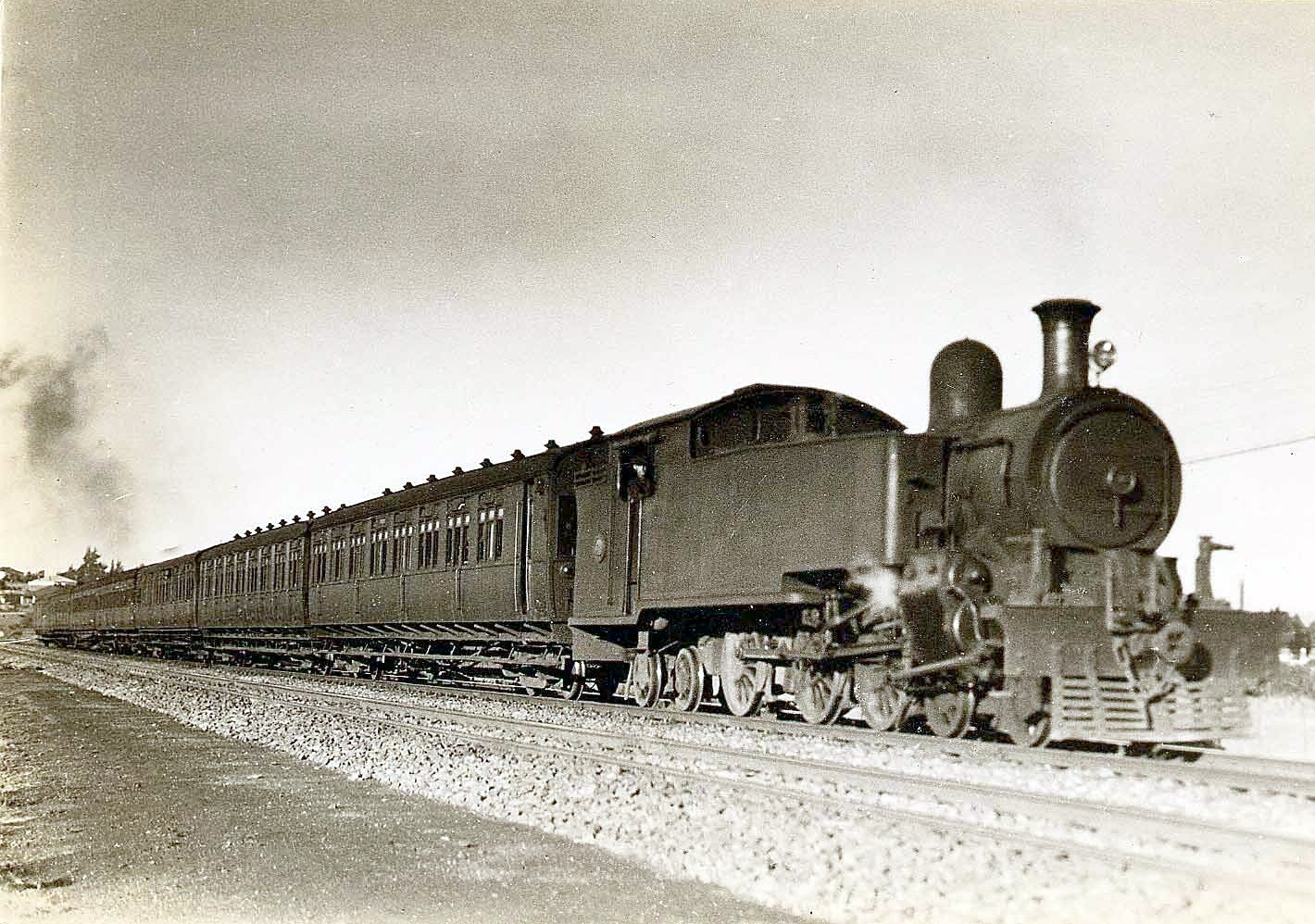
SAR Class K, c. 1930

Seven Class K tank locomotives which had been built for the Manila Railway Company in the Philippine Islands by the North British Locomotive Company in 1914, were sold to the SAR in 1917 since delivering them to the Philippines during the First World War became impossible. They were superheated, had Walschaerts valve gear and were the first locomotives in South Africa to be equipped with exhaust steam injectors, which were of the Davies & Metcalfe pattern. Nicknamed Manila, they remained in service until 1938.

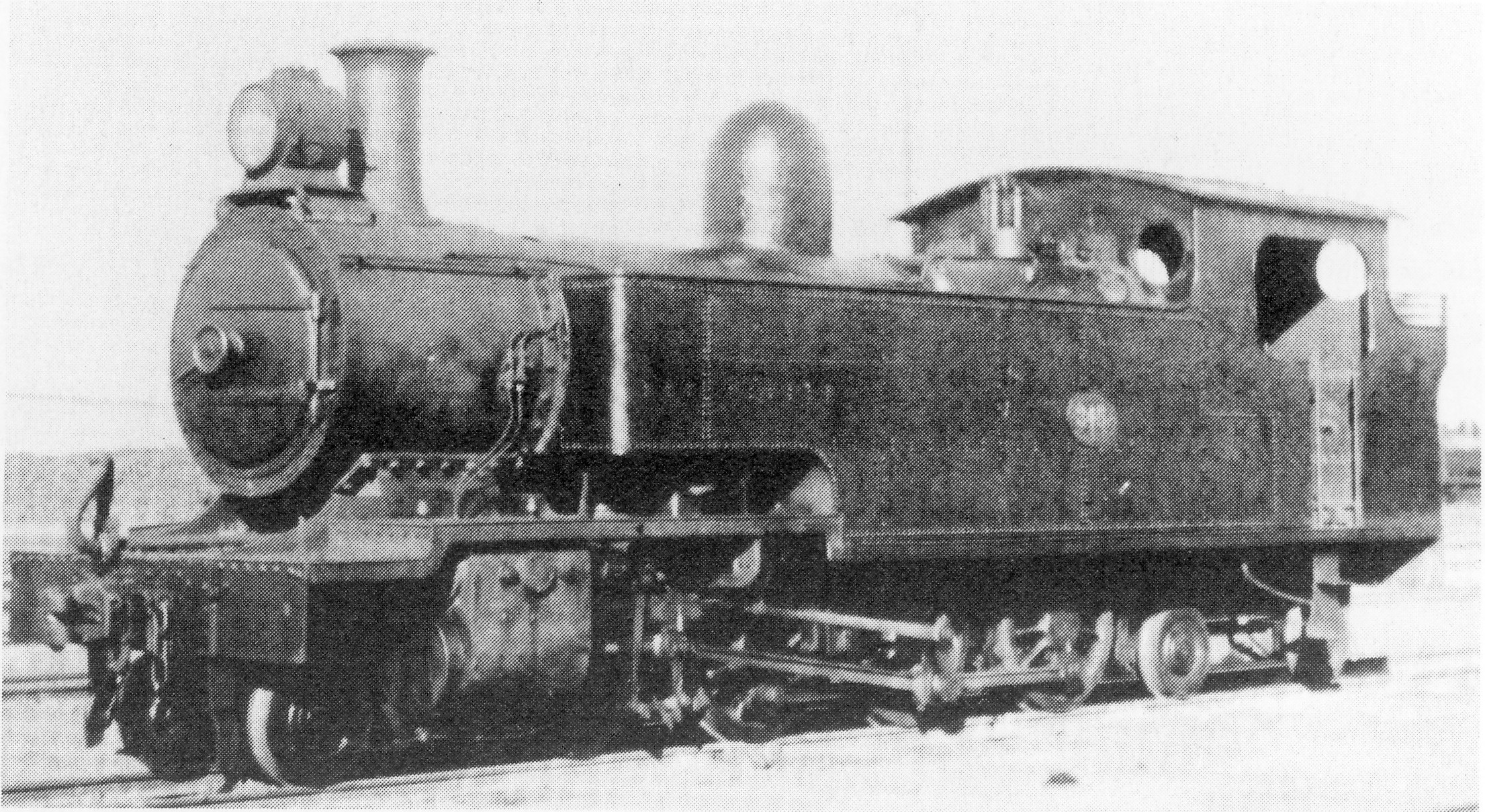
SAR Class J

Six tank locomotives, designed by SAR Chief Mechanical Engineer D.A. Hendrie and built by Nasmyth, Wilson & Company, were introduced on the SAR in 1915. Designated Class J, they had Walschaerts valve gear and Belpaire fireboxes and used saturated steam. Acquired to cope with increasing traffic on the Natal South Coast, but unable to handle the rapidly increasing loads due to their small proportions, they soon ended up being employed as shunting engines in the Durban harbour, at Mossel Bay and in the Cape Midlands, until they were withdrawn from service by 1957.

=== Soviet Union ===
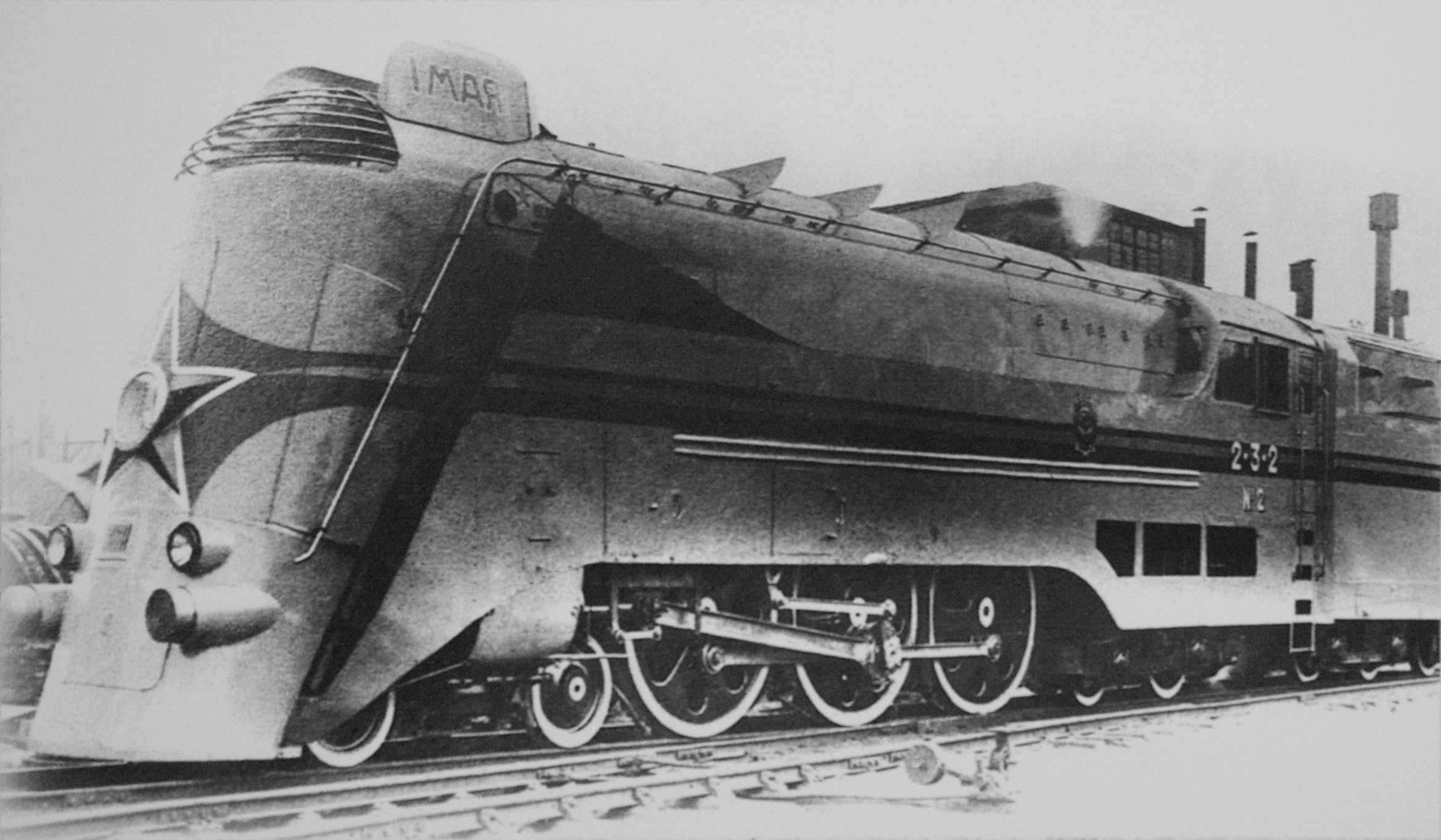
2-3-2K

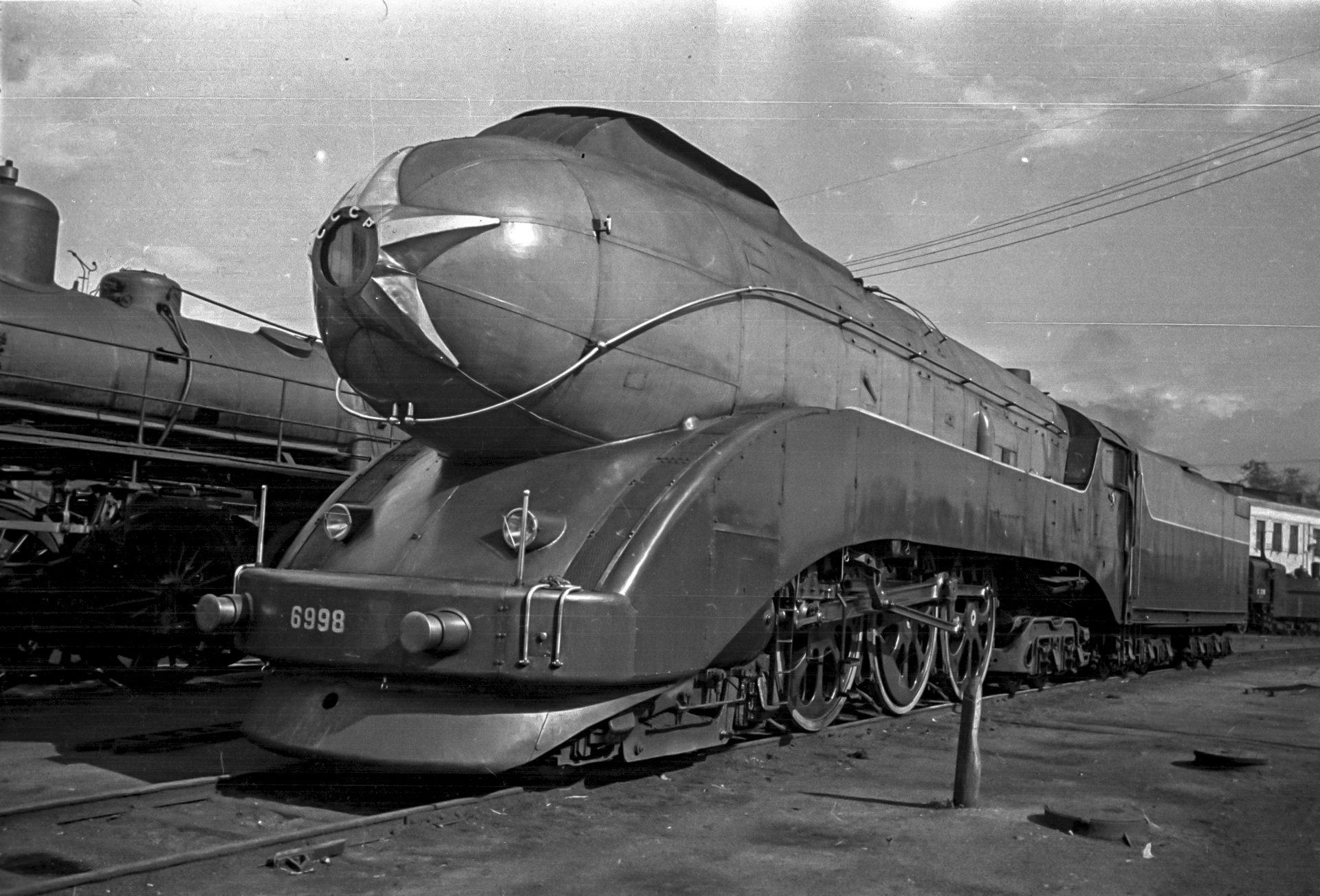
2-3-2V

Only three prototype Hudson locomotives were built in the former Soviet Union, in 1937 and 1938. They were all streamlined and were the only streamlined series of Soviet steam locomotives, although a later post-war P36 series 4-8-4 Northern locomotive was semi-streamlined. All three were scrapped in the 1950s.

- In 1937, two were built by the Kolomna Locomotive Works. These were known as the 2-3-2K locomotives, designed by Lev Lebedyanskii and rated at 3,070 horsepower (2,290 kilowatts). Designated the P12 series, they were used to haul the Red Arrow passenger train between Moscow and Leningrad. The intention was to build up to ten 2-3-2K locomotives to haul all express passenger trains between Moscow and Leningrad, but these plans were interrupted by the Second World War and not resumed.
- Another one was built in Voroshilovgrad in 1938, known as the 2-3-2V experimental locomotive number 6998. This locomotive was never used on mainline service.

=== United Kingdom ===
Tender locomotives

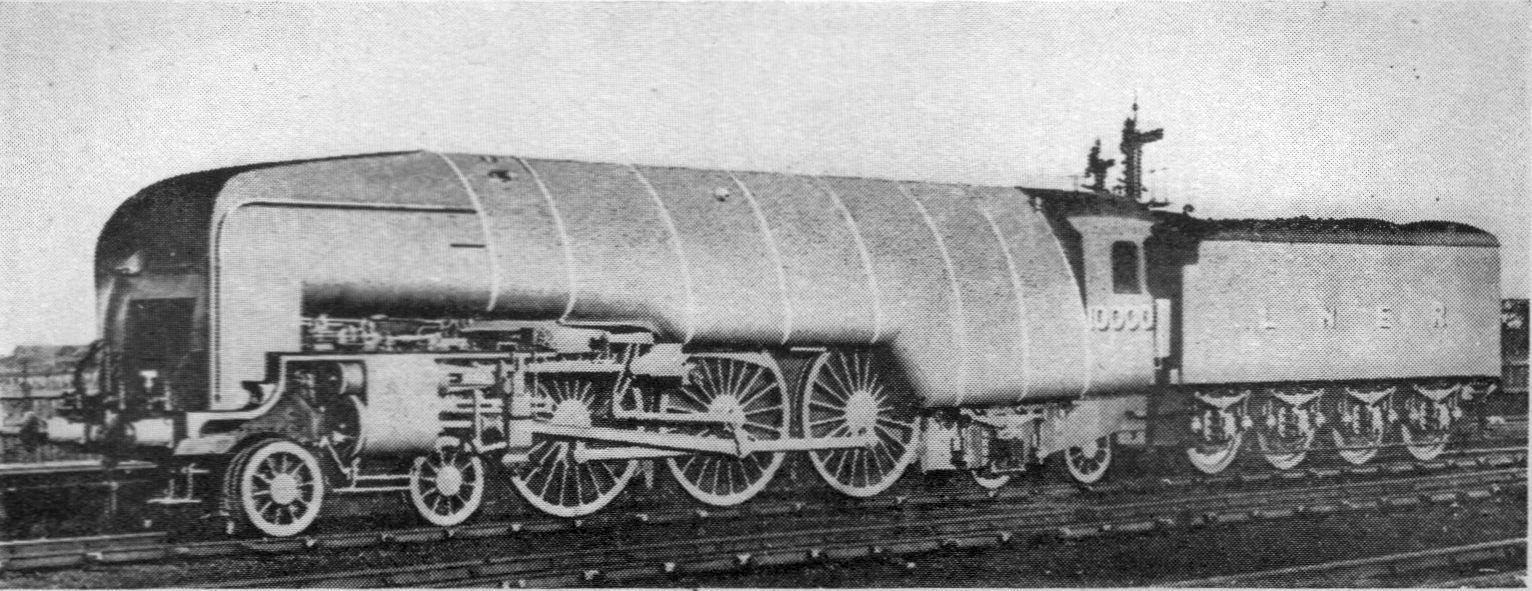
LNER Class W1 no. 10000

The only 4-6-4 tender locomotive in the United Kingdom was the London and North Eastern Railway (LNER) no. 10000, built in 1930 as an experimental high-pressure compound locomotive with an experimental high-pressure water-tube boiler. It was the only locomotive of the Class W1 and became known as the Hush-hush locomotive on account of the great secrecy under which it was built. Its trailing wheels were arranged uniquely. Instead of being in one four-wheel trailing truck, the first pair was a Cartazzi axle, mounted in a rigid frame but still allowed sideways deflection against a centering force, as typical of the LNER's practice on its Pacific locomotives. The second pair was in a two-wheel trailing truck.

The experiment proved much less successful than had been hoped and in 1936 it was rebuilt along the lines of a streamlined LNER Class A4 4-6-2, though it retained its 4-6-4 wheel arrangement. After being rebuilt, the Class W1 was still easily distinguishable from an A4 at a glance, without looking for the extra trailing wheels, by the fact that it was never officially named even though the name Pegasus had been proposed. It therefore became known among trainspotters as the Un-named or No-name Streak.

In 1938 William Stanier considered a 4-6-4 express passenger locomotive design, together with a related 4-8-4 as a large mixed-traffic locomotive, but during WWII the British government forbade the development of express passenger locomotives. The 4-8-4 design did continue though and in 1942 was looked at by Fairburn, the acting CME, as a possible post-war type for fast goods trains. After nationalization, British Railways would only pursue 4-6-2s, and later diesels, for their express passenger trains.

Tank locomotives

A number of 4-6-4T locomotives were built for various British railway companies.

The first standard-gauge examples were Robert Whitelegg's design in 1912 for the London, Tilbury and Southend Railway (LT&SR). They were only delivered after the LT&SR had been taken over by the Midland Railway, where they were designated the 2100 class.

Between 1914 and 1922, the London, Brighton and South Coast Railway (LB&SCR) built seven L class tank locomotives, known as the Brighton Baltics. The first examples suffered from instability problems until they were rebuilt with well-tanks. These high-speed tank locomotives hauled the famous Brighton Belle train until the electrification of the Brighton Main Line in 1933, after which they were converted into N15X class 4-6-0 tender locomotives. They remained in service until 1957.

The Glasgow and South Western Railway and a number of other railways also had tank locomotive classes of this wheel arrangement.

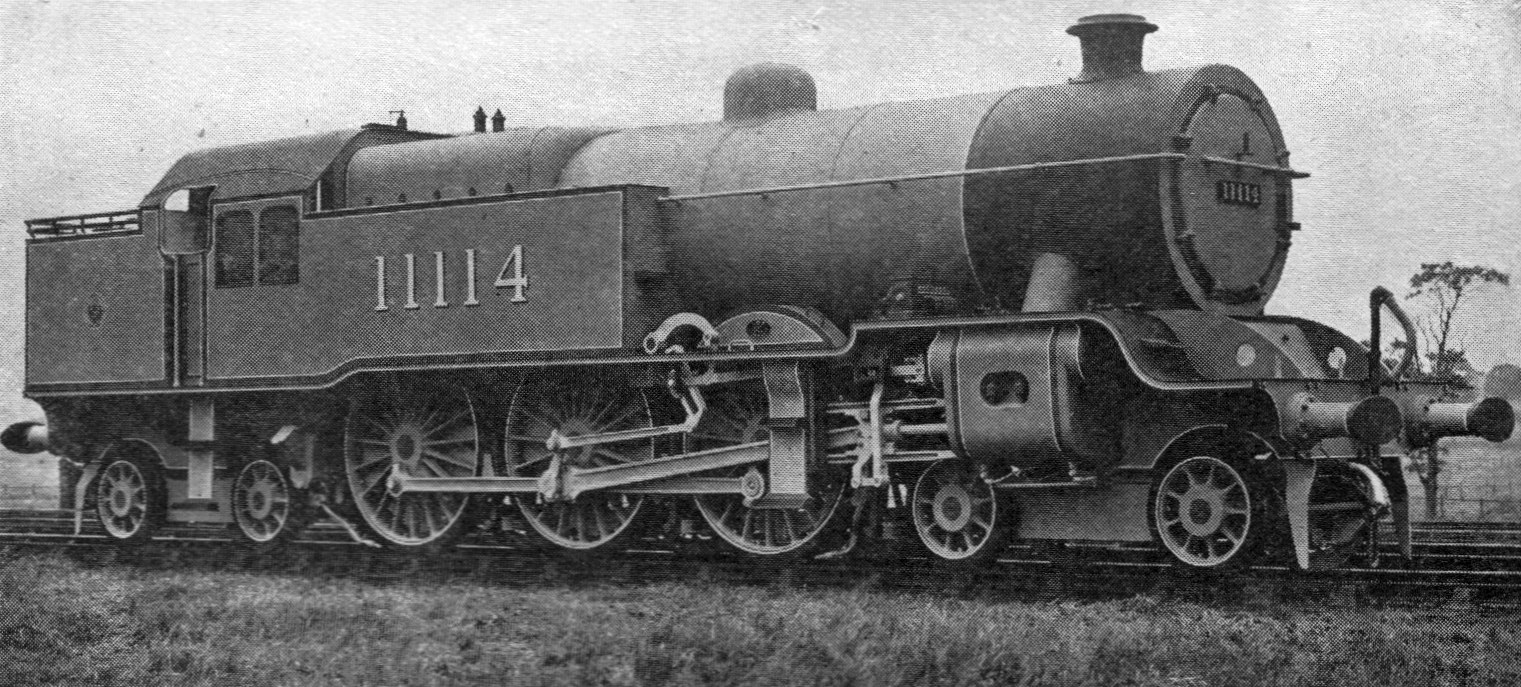
L&YR Hughes Dreadnought Tank

- The Lancashire and Yorkshire Railway examples were very rare in having four cylinders. Known as the Dreadnought Tanks, they proved to be too large and too complex for the duties they performed.
- The saturated steam tank locomotives of the Belfast and County Down Railway were highly unsuccessful because of poor valve settings.
- Contrarily, the Furness Railway 115 class (which also used saturated steam but with inside cylinders) were very popular with their crews.

=== United States ===
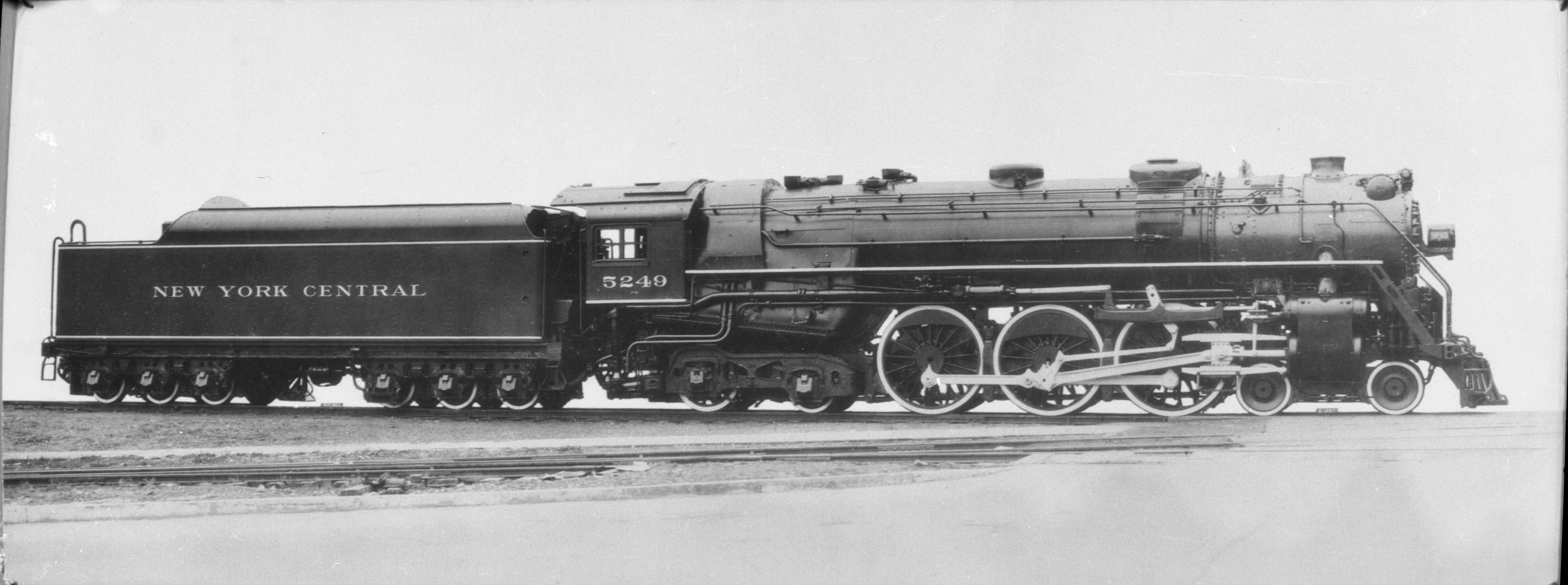
Builder's photo of New York Central J-1b Hudson #5249

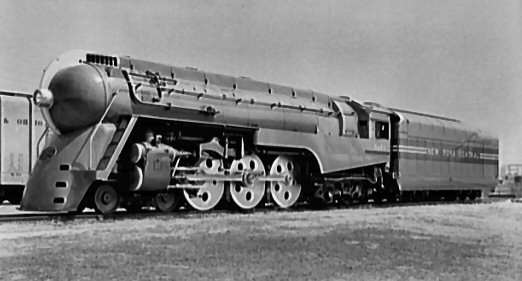
New York Central Hudson, streamlined for the 20th Century Limited

Except for the Grand Trunk Railway's K2 Class tank locomotives built in the 1910s, all American 4-6-4 locomotives had tenders.

The first Hudson locomotive in North America was built in 1927 for the New York Central Railroad (NYC) by the American Locomotive Company (ALCO), to the railroad's design. The locomotive proved to be very successful and was named the Hudson type, after the Hudson River. Thirteen of these locomotives, one J-1e type and twelve J-3a types, were streamlined for use with named passenger trains like the Empire State Express and the 20th Century Limited. Between the NYC and its subsidiaries, the Boston & Albany Railroad (B&A), the Cleveland, Cincinnati, Chicago & St Louis Railway (CCC&StL or Big Four) and the Michigan Central Railroad (MC), they acquired altogether 275 4-6-4 locomotives of several different types, the largest Hudson fleet in North America.

The Milwaukee Road could have produced the first American 4-6-4 since its design work was done earlier than that of the NYC, but financial constraints delayed the project and the Milwaukee's locomotives only emerged in 1930. The Milwaukee called them Baltic, following the European practice started in France. The initial order of fourteen Class F6 locomotives was followed by eight more Class F6a locomotives in 1931 and, in 1938, the Milwaukee acquired six streamlined Class F7 Hudsons with the shrouds. These took over the Milwaukee's crack Hiawatha express trains from the Class A 4-4-2 Atlantics and were among the fastest steam locomotives of all time.The schedules of many of these trains required extended running at 100 miles per hour (160 kilometres per hour). Similar to the Milwaukee F7s, the Chicago & North Western (CNW) Class E-4 were streamlined 4-6-4s with 84 in drivers.

Another early adopter of the 4-6-4 was the Atchison, Topeka, & Santa Fe (Santa Fe) who ordered 10 3450 class 4-6-4 locomotives in 1927 from Baldwin. The 3450 class employed the same boiler as Santa Fe's 3400 class Pacifics with a larger grate and slightly smaller 73 in drivers. Santa Fe designated their new 4-6-4 a "Heavy Pacific". In 1937, Santa Fe substantially modified their 3450 class, reducing tubing, increasing the firebox area, and increasing drivers to 79in. The same year, they ordered 6 more Heavy Pacific 4-6-4s (class 3460) from Baldwin including one streamlined locomotive (the Blue Goose, 3460). Like the F7 and E4, the 3460 class employed 84 inches (2,134 millimetres) drivers. In December 1937, locomotive #3461 set a world record for the longest single run by a steam locomotive by completing the 2,227 miles (3,584 km) from Los Angeles, California to Chicago without maintenance other than five re-fuelling stops en route, hauling Train #8, the Fast Mail Express.

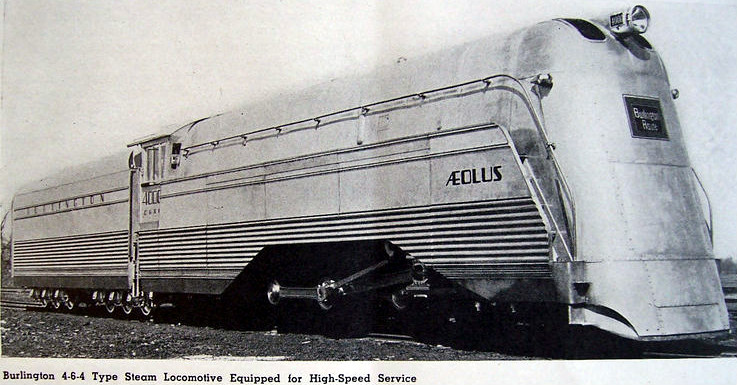
Streamlined Æolus at the CB&Q's Iowa shop in 1937

In 1937, the Chicago, Burlington & Quincy Railroad (Burlington Route) needed backup locomotives for their streamlined diesel-hauled Zephyr passenger trains. Their solution was to streamline their Baldwin-built No. 3002 in their main Iowa shops. The locomotive was renumbered 4000 and given the name Æolus, after the mythical keeper of the winds. A second streamlined 4-6-4 was built for this purpose and numbered 4001.

There were also some once-off and experimental 4-6-4 locomotives. A number were rebuilt from 4-6-2 Pacific locomotives, or in some cases from other designs.

- The Baltimore and Ohio Railroad (B&O) built four as experimental locomotives between 1933 and 1936, using Colonel Emerson's water-tube fireboxes, but eventually turned to diesel-electric traction instead.
- In 1937, the Illinois Central Railroad (IC) rebuilt a 2-8-4 Berkshire into its only Hudson, the Illinois Central No. 1, which was not a success and was not repeated. The railroad had also rebuilt seven 4-6-0s gained with acquisition of the Chesapeake, Ohio and Southwestern Railroad into 4-6-4Ts for easier bi-directional operation. All were scrapped with their line's electrification finishing in 1928.
- The Wabash Railroad rebuilt its seven Class P1 Hudsons from their unsuccessful K-4 and K5 Class 2-8-2 Mikado locomotives.
- From 1937 to 1941 the Frisco Railroad rebuilt their 10 1060 class 1917-built 4-6-2s. While large and powerful they had initially had firebox problems, but the rebuild as Hudsons resolved this in addition to further boosting their strength. They received blue streamlining on their running boards and some lasted into the last year of steam on the Frisco in 1952.
- In 1946 the Chesapeake and Ohio Railway rebuilt their five F-19 class pacifics into hudsons, with four of them gaining streamlining. These were in addition the as-built 4-6-4s purchased and to be purchased by the road. They were intended to serve alongside the new streamlined M-1 class steam turbine locomotives on the new Chessie service. However, the train's launch was cancelled due to declining post-war passenger numbers, and dieselization meant both the rebuilds and newbuilds were all retired by the mid-1950s. One of the rebuilds, 490, has been preserved, still with its streamlining, at the Baltimore and Ohio Railroad Museum.

==== North American production list ====
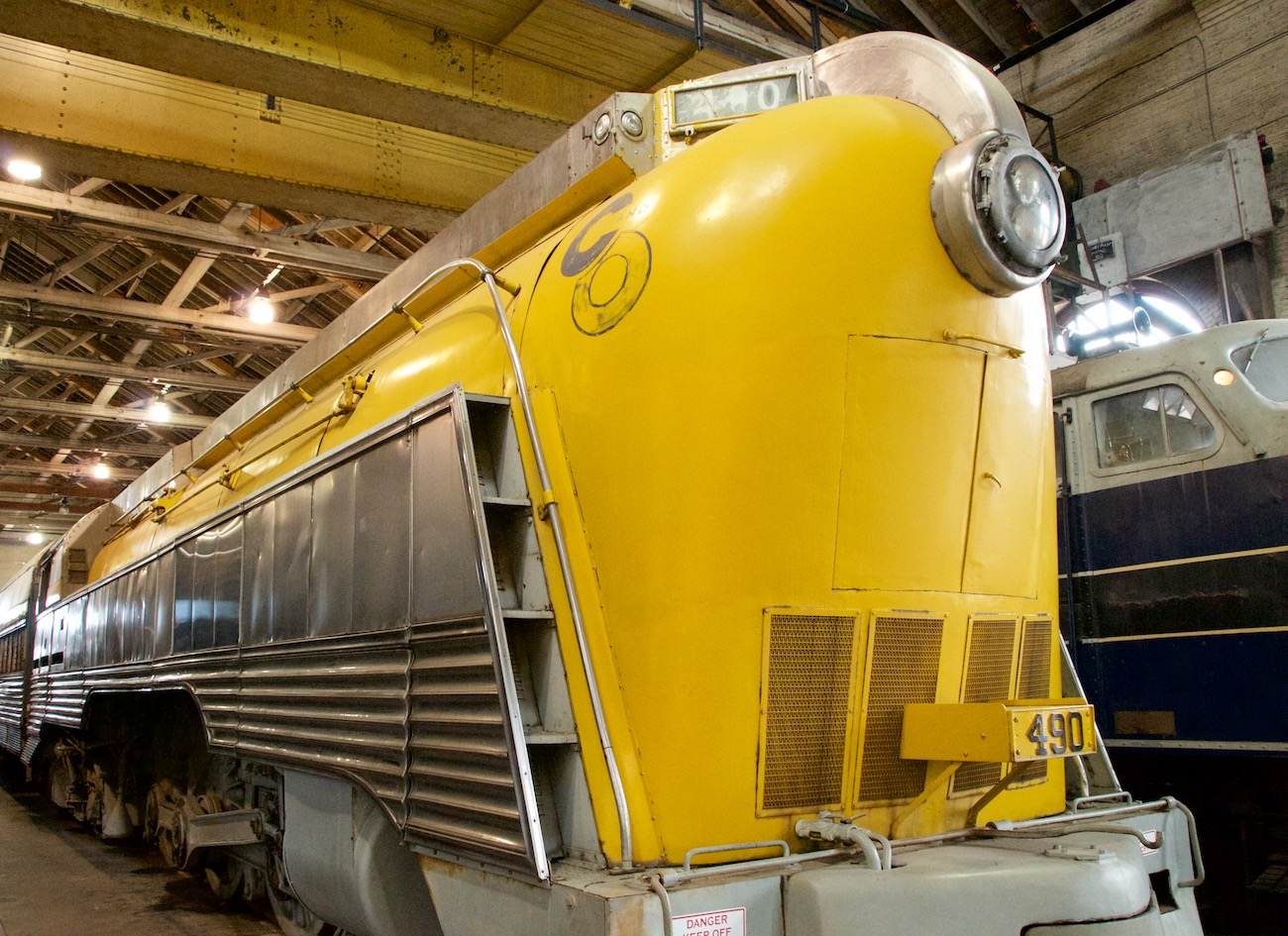
Chesapeake and Ohio 490 Hudson Steam Locomotive at the National Museum of Railroad History & Innovation in Baltimore, Maryland. The locomotive was built as a 4-6-2 Pacific in 1926 and modified to this configuration in 1946.

Altogether 21 railroads in North America owned 4-6-4s. Many were similar in concept to the NYC Hudsons, with 79 to 80 inches (2,007 to 2,032 millimetres) driving wheels, but most were a little larger than the NYC locomotives, such as the F6 and F6a classes of the Milwaukee Road, the K-5-a class of the Canadian National, the Canadian Pacific locomotives, the S-4 class of the Burlington Route, the I-5 class of the New Haven and the 1151 class of the Lackawanna. The heaviest were the C&O's L2a class at 443,000 lbs, There were also the lightweights, which include the L-1 class of the Nickel Plate Road, the class D of the Maine Central and the class NR-1 of the Ferrocarriles Nacionales de México (N de M). On these, the extra axle was used to reduce the axle load in comparison to a 4-6-2 Pacific locomotive.

Because the 4-6-4 design was really only optimally suited to express passenger trains, which were dieselised early, the Hudsons were early candidates for withdrawal and scrapping. None of the NYC locomotives survived and neither did any of the Milwaukee locomotives. Five Canadian Pacific Hudsons survive, including four Royal Hudsons and the un-streamlined Canadian Pacific 2816. Five of the Burlington Route locomotives survive, including the Aeolus. Other surviving 4-6-4 locomotives are two each of the Santa Fe and Canadian National, and single examples from the Chesapeake and Ohio Railway, N de M and Nickel Plate Road. The Pennsylvania Railroad also owned the P5 class of electric locomotives, also with a 4-6-4 wheel arrangement.

North American 4-6-4 locomotives (in order of introduction)
Railroad	Qty	Class	Road numbers	Builder	Build years	Notes
GT	6	K2	1540–1545	Montreal	1914	Tank engines. Later CN 45–50, class X-10-a
NYC	145	J-1	5200–5344	ALCO	1927–1931	
NYC	50	J-3a	5405–5454	ALCO	1937–1938	
MC (NYC)	10	J-1b	8200–8209	ALCO	1927	Renumbered NYC 5345–5354
MC (NYC)	5	J-1c	8210–8214	ALCO	1929	Renumbered NYC 5355–5359
MC (NYC)	15	J-1d	8215–8229	ALCO	1930	Renumbered NYC 5360–5374
ATSF	10	3450	3450–3459	Baldwin	1927	"Heavy Pacific"
ATSF	6	3460	3460–3465	Baldwin	1937	One streamlined (No. 3460) - "Heavy Pacific"
NKP	4	L-1a	170–173	ALCO	1927	170 Preserved.
NKP	4	L-1b	174–177	Lima	1929	
B&A (NYC)	5	J-2a	600–604	ALCO	1928	Renumbered NYC 5455–5459
B&A (NYC)	5	J-2b	605–609	ALCO	1930	Renumbered NYC 5460–5464
B&A (NYC)	10	J-2c	610–619	Lima	1931	Renumbered NYC 5465–5474
CCC&StL (NYC)	20	J-1d	6600–6619	ALCO	1929	Renumbered NYC 5375–5394
CCC&StL (NYC)	10	J-1e	6620–6629	ALCO	1931	Renumbered NYC 5395–5404
CP	10	H1a	2800–2809	Montreal	1929	
CP	10	H1b	2810–2819	Montreal	1930	Canadian Pacific 2816 The Empress is the only surviving example of the class H1b 4-6-4, and is the only operating 4-6-4 Hudson type in North America
CP	30	H1c	2820–2849	Montreal	1937	(Streamlined) Canadian Pacific 2839 is the only surviving example of the class H1c 4-6-4; It was one of the two Royal Hudsons that made a number of excursion trips through Pennsylvania, Virginia, Tennessee, North Carolina, South Carolina, Georgia, Louisiana in the United States.
CP	10	H1d	2850–2859	Montreal	1938	(Streamlined) Canadian Pacific 2850 and 2858 are the only two remaining Class H1d Royal Hudsons. Canadian Pacific 2850 is the oldest class H1d built. The "royal" name was granted to the Canadian Hudson-class locomotives by King George VI after they were used to pull the royal train during the 1939 royal tour of Canada.
CP	5	H1e	2860–2864	Montreal	1940	(Streamlined, oil burner) Canadian Pacific 2860 is the only surviving example of the class H1e 4-6-4, and one of the two operating 4-6-4 Hudson types in North America along with 2816.
CN	5	K-5-a	5700–5704	Montreal	1930	5702 and 5703 Preserved.
MILW	14	F6	6400–6413	Baldwin	1930	Renumbered 125–138
MILW	8	F6-a	6414–6421	Baldwin	1931	Renumbered 142–146, 139–141
MILW	6	F7	100–105	ALCO	1938	Streamlined
MEC	2	D	701–702	Baldwin	1930	
CB&Q	12	S-4	3000–3011	Baldwin	1930	3002 rebuilt as class S-4A 4000 Æolus
CB&Q	1	S-4	3012	CB&Q Burlington	1935	New
CB&Q	1	S-4A	4001	CB&Q Burlington	1938	New, streamlined, named Æolus
B&O	1	V-1	5047	B&O Mt Clare	1933	Rebuilt from P-1 class
B&O	1	V-2	2	B&O Mt Clare	1935	New; renumbered 5340
B&O	1	V-3	5350	B&O Mt Clare	1935	New
B&O	1	V-4	5360	B&O Mt Clare	1936	New
DL&W	5	1151	1151–1155	ALCO	1937	
IC	1	–	1	IC	1937	Rebuilt from 2-8-4 No. 7038
N de M	10	NR-1	2700–2709	ALCO	1937	2708 preserved.
NH	10	I-5	1400–1409	Baldwin	1937	Semi-streamlined
SLSF	10	1060	1060–1069	SLSF	1937–1941	Rebuilt from 1060 Class Baldwin 1917 built 4-6-2s
CNW	9	E-4	4000–4008	ALCO	1938	Streamlined
C&O	8	L-2	300–307	Baldwin	1941	Scrapped, but the C&O class K4 Kanawhas match their same appearances; even so if their 2-8-4 wheel arrangement is different.
C&O	5	L-1	490–494	C&O	1946–1947	Rebuilt from Class F19 4-6-2; four streamlined
C&O	5	L-2a	310–314	Baldwin	1948	Scrapped, but the C&O class K-4 Kanawhas match their same appearances; even so if their wheel arrangement is different.
WAB	7	P-1	700–706	WAB Decatur Shops	1943–1947	Rebuilt from 2-8-2s

== Model railroading ==
The Lionel Corporation used the 4-6-4 arrangement in several of its locomotives.
