= South African Class E 4-6-4T =

1902 design of steam locomotive

NGR Class F 4-6-4T South African Class E 4-6-4T
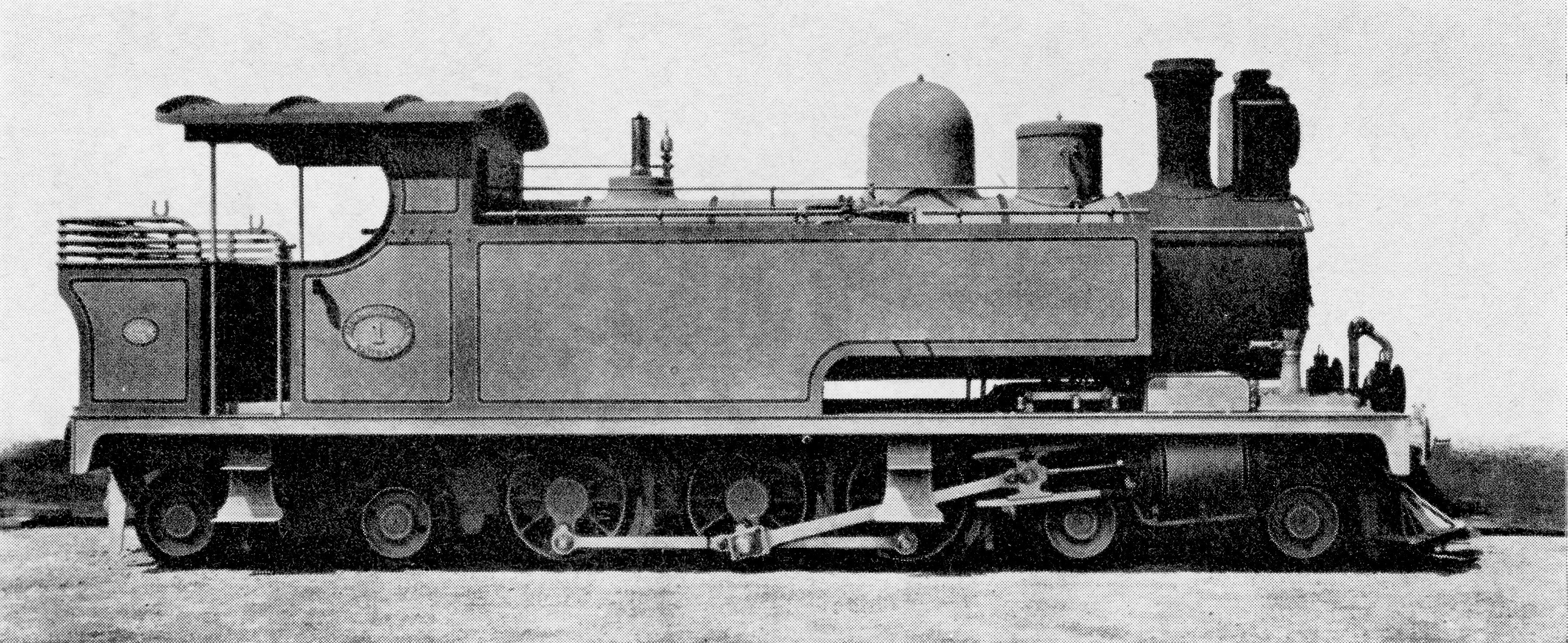
- NGR Class F no. 1, SAR Class E no. 87
Type and origin
- Power type: Steam
- Designer: Natal Government Railways (G.W. Reid)
- Builder: Neilson, Reid and Company
- Serial number: 6158–6167
- Build date: 1902
- Total produced: 10
Specifications
- Configuration
  - Whyte: 4-6-4T (Baltic)
  - UIC: 2'C2'n2t
- Driver: 2nd coupled axle
- Gauge: 3 ft 6 in (1,067 mm) Cape gauge
- Leading dia.: 25 3/4 in (654 mm)
- Coupled dia.: 39 in (991 mm)
- Trailing dia.: 25 3/4 in (654 mm)
- Wheelbase: 25 ft 7 1/4 in (7,804 mm)
  - Axle spacing (Asymmetrical): 1-2: 3 ft 7 1/2 in (1,105 mm); 2-3: 4 ft 1 1/2 in (1,257 mm)
  - Leading: 5 ft (1,524 mm)
  - Coupled: 7 ft 9 in (2,362 mm)
  - Trailing: 5 ft (1,524 mm)
- Length
  - Over couplers: 32 ft 3 1/4 in (9,836 mm)
- Height: 11 ft 6 in (3,505 mm)
- Frame type: Plate
- Axle load: 9 LT (9,144 kg)
  - Leading: 6 LT 15 cwt 2 qtr (6,884 kg)
  - 1st coupled: 8 LT 7 cwt (8,484 kg)
  - 2nd coupled: 9 LT (9,144 kg)
  - 3rd coupled: 8 LT 5 cwt (8,382 kg)
  - Trailing: 6 LT 15 cwt 2 qtr (6,884 kg)
- Adhesive weight: 25 LT 12 cwt (26,010 kg)
- Loco weight: 39 LT 3 cwt (39,780 kg)
- Fuel type: Coal
- Fuel capacity: 2 LT 5 cwt (2.3 t)
- Water cap.: 1,080 imp gal (4,900 L)
- Firebox
  - Type: Round-top
  - Grate area: 12.7 sq ft (1.18 m^{2})
- Boiler
  - Pitch: 6 ft 3 in (1,905 mm)
  - Diameter: 3 ft 8 1/8 in (1,121 mm)
  - Tube plates: 10 ft 3 in (3,124 mm)
  - Small tubes: 171: 1 3/4 in (44 mm)
- Boiler pressure: 175 psi (1,207 kPa)
- Safety valve: Ramsbottom
- Heating surface
  - Firebox: 70 sq ft (6.5 m^{2})
  - Tubes: 803 sq ft (74.6 m^{2})
  - Total surface: 873 sq ft (81.1 m^{2})
- Cylinders: Two
- Cylinder size: 15 in (381 mm) bore 22 in (559 mm) stroke
- Valve gear: Stephenson
- Valve type: Slide
- Couplers: Johnston link-and-pin
Performance figures
- Tractive effort: 16,650 lbf (74.1 kN) @ 75%
Career
- Operators: Natal Government Railways; South African Railways
- Class: NGR Class F SAR Class E
- Number in class: 10
- Numbers: NGR 1-10, SAR 87-96
- Delivered: 1902
- First run: 1902
- Withdrawn: 1937

The South African Railways Class E 4-6-4T of 1902 was a steam locomotive from the pre-Union era in the Colony of Natal.

In 1902, the Natal Government Railways placed ten Class F 4-6-4 Baltic type tank steam locomotives in service. In 1912, when these locomotives were assimilated into the South African Railways, they were renumbered and reclassified as Class E.

== Manufacturer ==
The last locomotive to be designed for the Natal Government Railways (NGR) by Locomotive Superintendent G.W. Reid before he relinquished his appointment in 1902, was a 4-6-4T locomotive, the first known locomotive in the world to be designed and built as a 4-6-4 Baltic type.

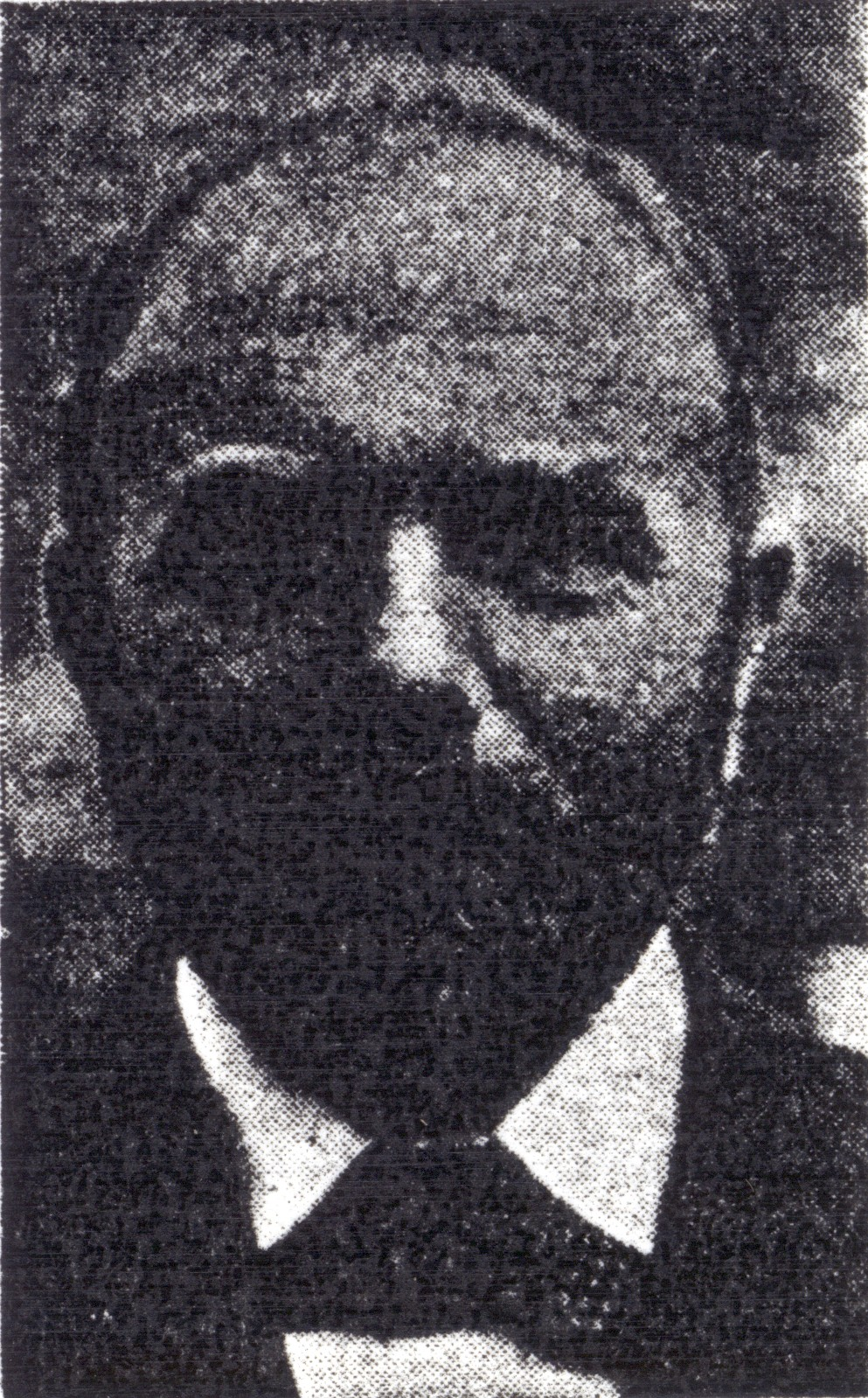
G.W. Reid

It was built for the NGR by Neilson, Reid and Company who delivered ten of them in 1902, numbered in the range from 1 to 10. In NGR service, they were known as the Neilson, Reid locomotives until a classification system was introduced at some stage between 1904 and 1908 and they were designated the NGR Class F.

The NGR Class F was a larger version of the NGR Class H Stephenson-built 4-6-4T locomotive, which Reid had rebuilt from a Class G 4-6-0T locomotive in 1896 and which later became the sole Class C2 on the South African Railways (SAR). Many of the main dimensions were identical. They had plate frames, Stephenson valve gear and used saturated steam.

== South African Railways ==
When the Union of South Africa was established on 31 May 1910, the three Colonial government railways (Cape Government Railways, NGR and Central South African Railways) were united under a single administration to control and administer the railways, ports and harbours of the Union. Although the South African Railways and Harbours came into existence in 1910, the actual classification and renumbering of all the rolling stock of the three constituent railways were only implemented with effect from 1 January 1912.

In 1912, these locomotives were designated Class E on the SAR roster and renumbered in the range from 87 to 96. During 1926, their boiler pressure setting was reduced to 160 pounds per square inch (1,103 kilopascals), which reduced their tractive effort to 15,230 pounds-force (67.7 kilonewtons) at 75% of boiler pressure.

== Service ==
=== South Africa ===
The locomotives were built specifically for use on the Natal South Coast and the Richmond branch, where reverse running was required due to the absence of turning facilities such as turntables or triangles. In SAR service, the Class E was mainly used for shunting work.

=== First World War ===
In 1915, shortly after the outbreak of the First World War, the German South West Africa colony was occupied by the Union Defence Forces. Since a large part of the territory's railway infrastructure and rolling stock was destroyed or damaged by retreating German forces, an urgent need arose for locomotives for use on the Cape gauge lines in that territory. In 1917, numbers 87 and 92 were transferred to the Defence Department for service in South West Africa. Both locomotives are believed to have returned to South Africa after the war.

The locomotives were later transferred to the Cape Midland System, where they remained for the rest of their service lives. They were withdrawn from service and scrapped in 1937.
