= South African Class J 4-6-4T =

1915 design of steam locomotive

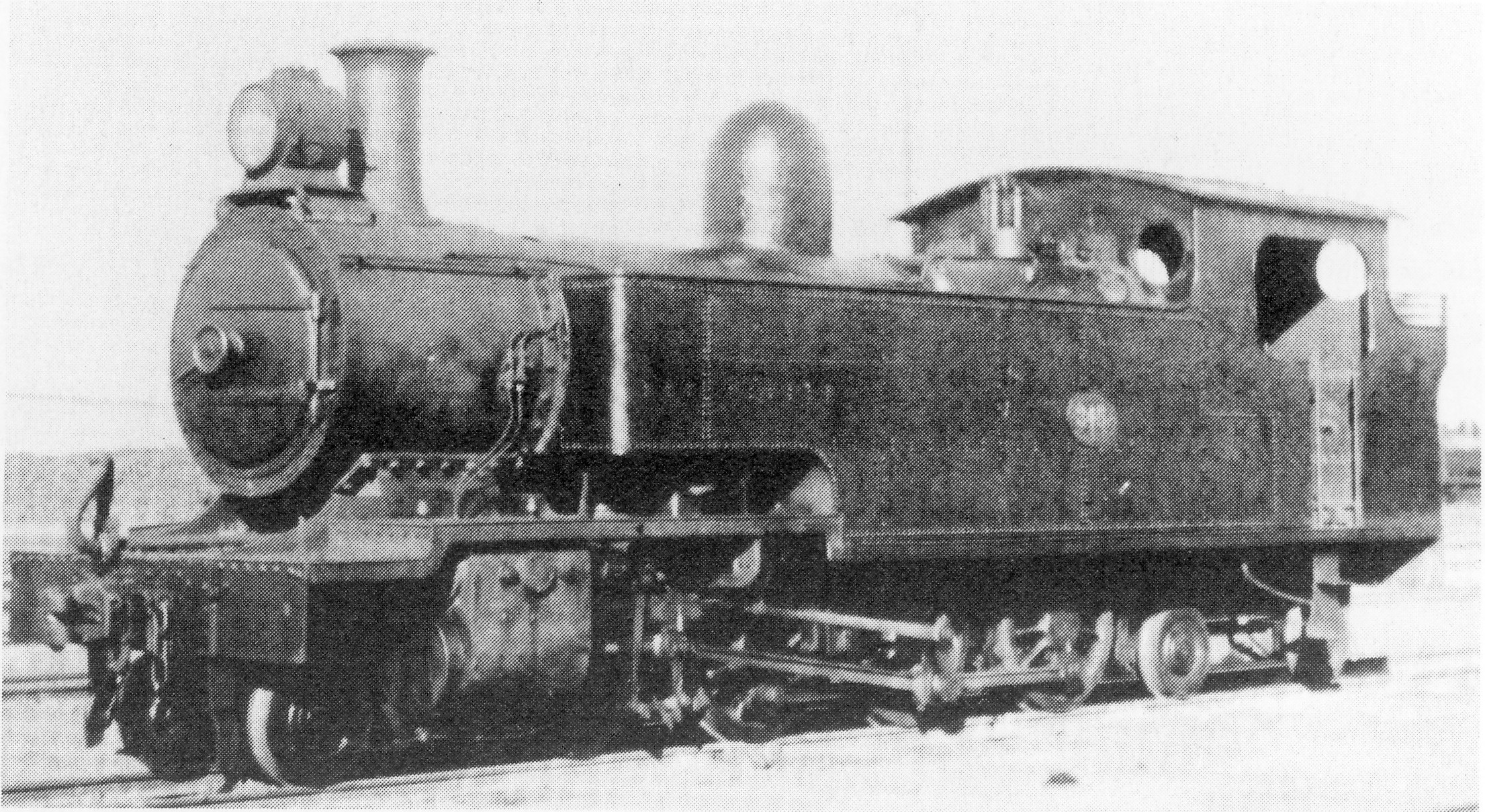
- Class J no. 345, c. 1950
Type and origin
- Power type: Steam
- Designer: South African Railways (D.A. Hendrie)
- Builder: Nasmyth, Wilson and Company
- Serial number: 1060–1065
- Model: Class J
- Build date: 1915
- Total produced: 6
Specifications
- Configuration
  - Whyte: 4-6-4T (Baltic)
  - UIC: 2'C2'n2t
- Driver: 2nd coupled axle
- Gauge: 3 ft 6 in (1,067 mm) Cape gauge
- Leading dia.: 25 3/4 in (654 mm)
- Coupled dia.: 42 3/4 in (1,086 mm)
- Trailing dia.: 25 3/4 in (654 mm)
- Wheelbase: 27 ft 5 in (8,357 mm)
  - Axle spacing (Asymmetrical): 1-2: 4 ft (1,219 mm); 2-3: 4 ft 6 in (1,372 mm)
  - Leading: 5 ft 4 in (1,626 mm)
  - Coupled: 8 ft 6 in (2,591 mm)
  - Trailing: 5 ft 4 in (1,626 mm)
- Length
  - Over couplers: 34 ft 3/4 in (10,382 mm)
- Height: 12 ft (3,658 mm)
- Axle load: 11 LT 4 cwt (11,380 kg)
  - Leading: 9 LT 12 cwt (9,754 kg)
  - 1st coupled: 10 LT 10 cwt (10,670 kg)
  - 2nd coupled: 11 LT 4 cwt (11,380 kg)
  - 3rd coupled: 11 LT (11,180 kg)
  - Trailing: 10 LT 2 cwt (10,260 kg)
- Adhesive weight: 32 LT 14 cwt (33,220 kg)
- Loco weight: 52 LT 8 cwt (53,240 kg)
- Fuel type: Coal
- Fuel capacity: 3 LT (3.0 t)
- Water cap.: 1,200 imp gal (5,460 L)
- Firebox
  - Type: Belpaire
  - Grate area: 15 sq ft (1.4 m^{2})
- Boiler
  - Pitch: 6 ft 9 in (2,057 mm)
  - Diameter: 3 ft 10 1/4 in (1,175 mm)
  - Tube plates: 10 ft 5 3/4 in (3,194 mm)
  - Small tubes: 171: 1 3/4 in (44 mm)
- Boiler pressure: 175 psi (1,207 kPa)
- Safety valve: Ramsbottom
- Heating surface
  - Firebox: 88 sq ft (8.2 m^{2})
  - Tubes: 821 sq ft (76.3 m^{2})
  - Total surface: 909 sq ft (84.4 m^{2})
- Cylinders: Two
- Cylinder size: 15 in (381 mm) bore 22 in (559 mm) stroke
- Valve gear: Walschaerts
- Valve type: Piston
- Couplers: Johnston link-and-pin AAR knuckle (1930s)
Performance figures
- Tractive effort: 15,200 lbf (68 kN) @ 75%
Career
- Operators: South African Railways
- Class: Class J
- Number in class: 6
- Numbers: 341–346
- Delivered: 1915
- First run: 1915
- Withdrawn: 1957

The South African Railways Class J 4-6-4T of 1915 was a steam locomotive.

In 1915, the South African Railways placed six Class J tank steam locomotives with a 4-6-4 Baltic type wheel arrangement in service.

== Manufacturer ==
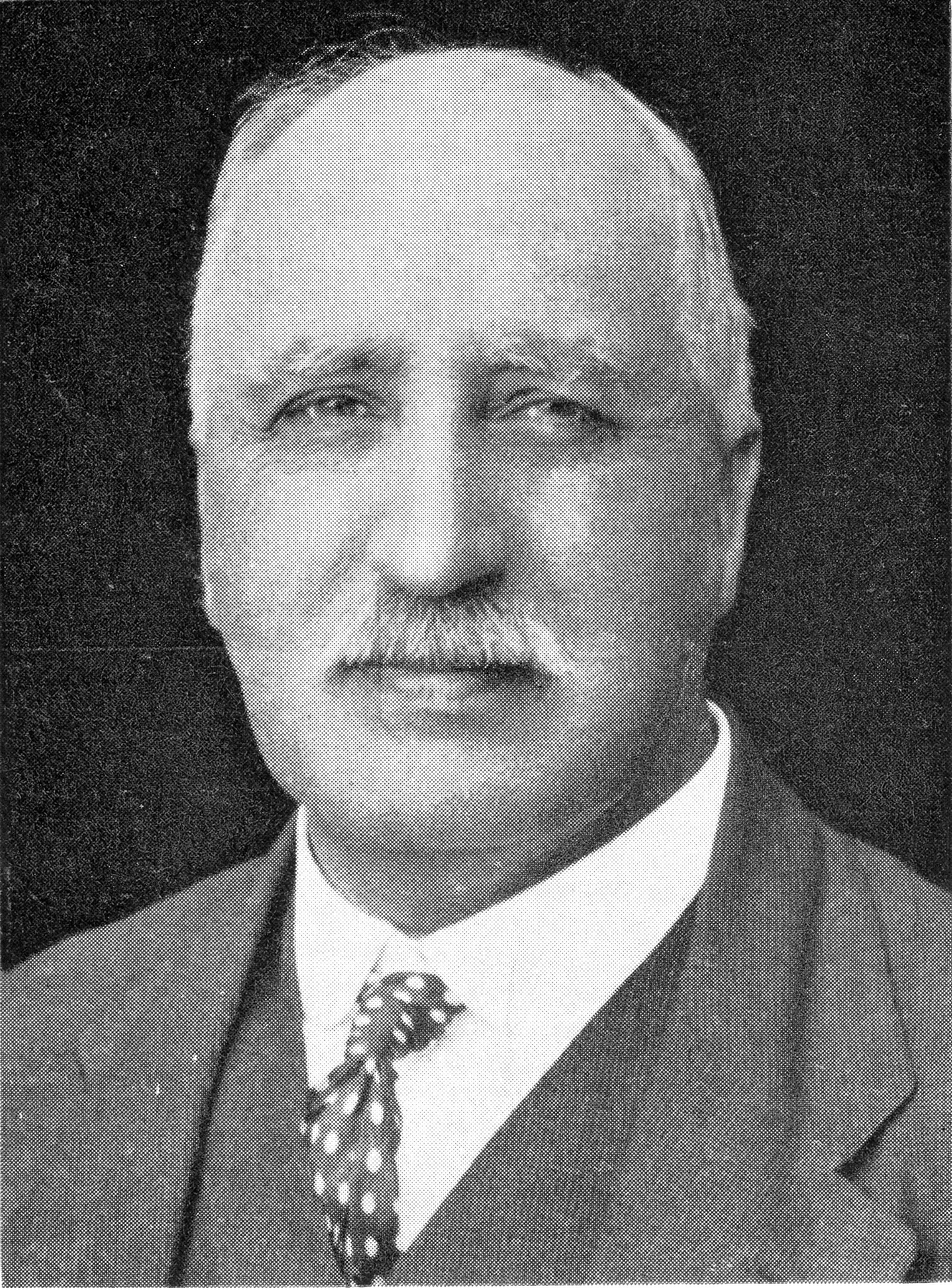
D.A. Hendrie

To cope with the increasing traffic on the Natal South Coast, D.A. Hendrie, the Chief Mechanical Engineer (CME) of the South African Railways (SAR), reverted to the old Natal Government Railways preference and designed a new 4-6-4 Baltic type side-tank steam locomotive.

Six of these locomotives were built by Nasmyth, Wilson and Company of Patricroft in Salford, England, and delivered in 1915, numbered in the range from 341 to 346. They were designated Class J and were the first side-tank engines to be acquired by the SAR since Union.

== Characteristics ==
The engines used saturated steam and had Walschaerts valve gear, piston valves and Belpaire fireboxes. They were designed to work as double-enders on the Natal South Coast line where there was limited engine turning facilities.

== Service ==
It was soon found, however, that due to their small proportions, they were of insufficient power to handle the rapidly increasing loads on the South Coast. They were therefore taken off the South Coast run and employed as shunting engines in the Durban harbour.

Four of them were later allocated to Mossel Bay and the Cape Midland for similar duties. They remained there until they were withdrawn by 1957 after more than forty years in service. The remaining two locomotives, numbers 341 and 342, were sold to gold mines on the Reef.

By the early 1970s, no. 341 was still at work on the East Daggafontein Mine as their no. 2. It was later acquired by the South African National Railway And Steam Museum (SANRASM) for preservation. It had to be scrapped in 2011, however, after being vandalised by scavenging scrap metal thieves at the SANRASM storage site in Chamdor.

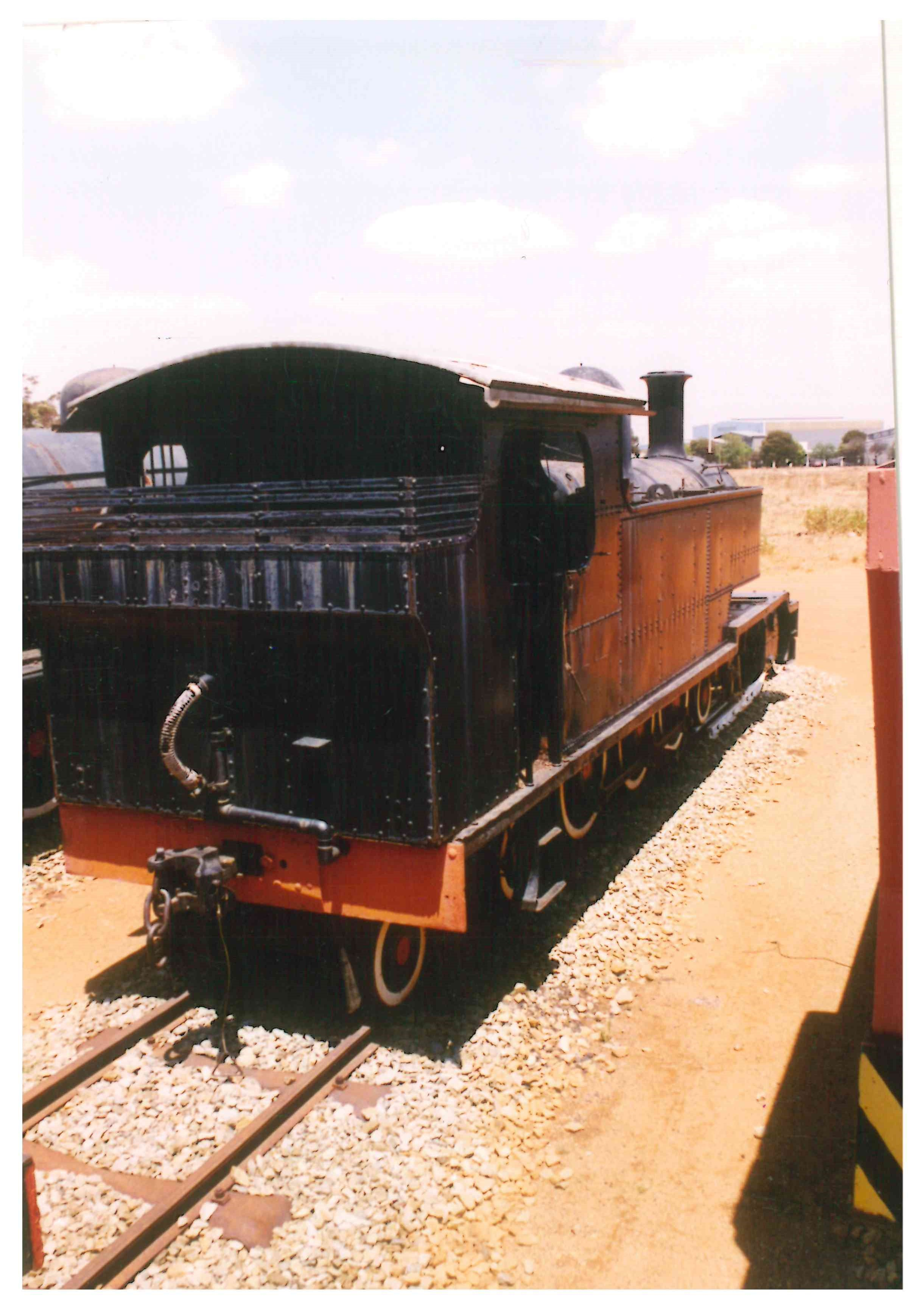

== Illustration ==
No. 341 was plinthed at SANRASM with a tender. The picture shows it as gate guard, prior to being vandalised into destruction c. 2010.

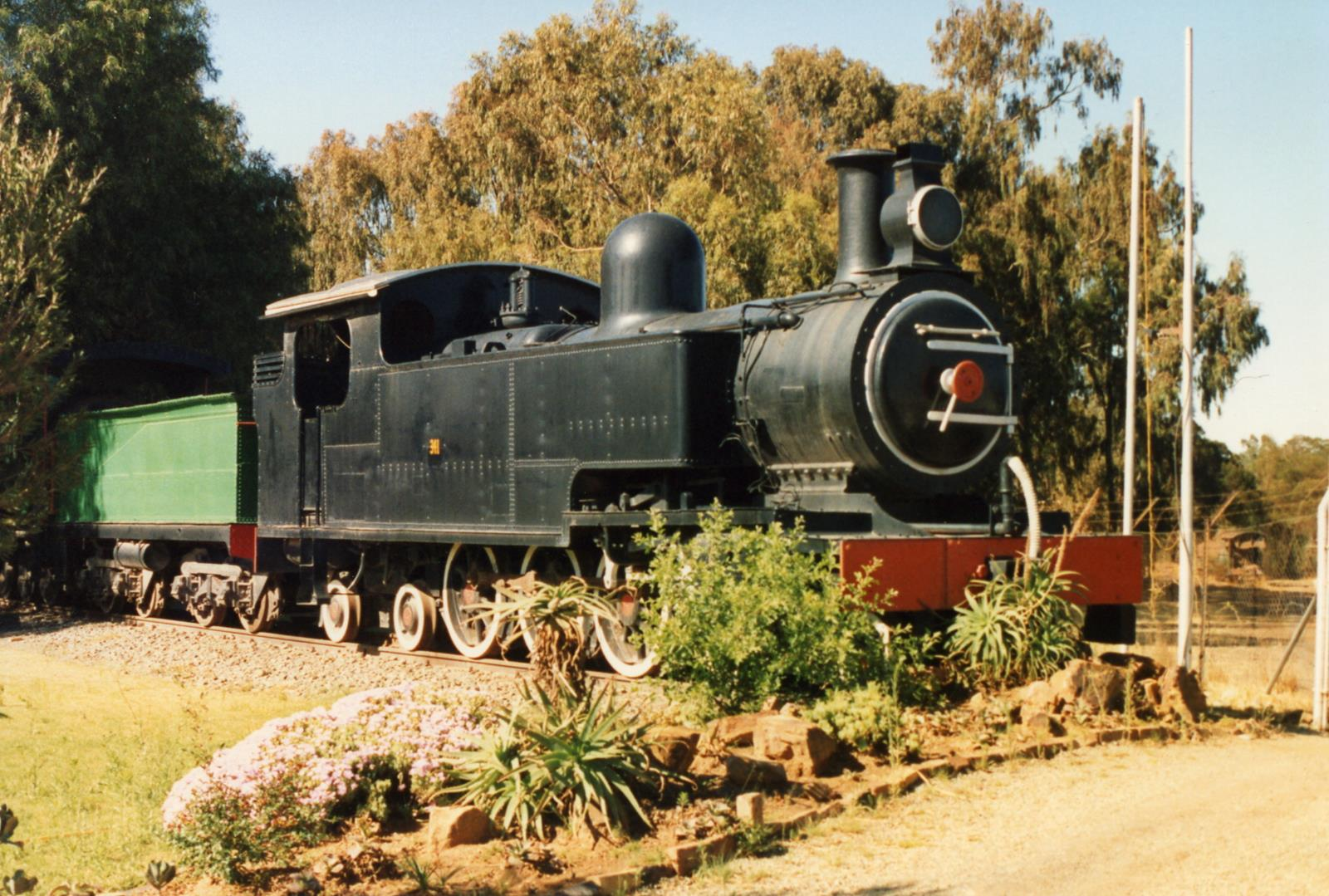
No. 341, East Daggafontein Mine no. 2 with a tender, 9 October 1989
