= Wabash class P1 =

Class of American 4-6-4 Hudson Type steam locomotives

Wabash class P-1 Hudson (Rebuilt : K4 and K5 Mikado’s)
- Wabash #700 at Cerro Gordo, Illinois, June 19, 1946
Type and origin
- Power type: Steam
- Builder: American Locomotive Company
- Build date: 1925 (As Class K4 and K5 2-8-2 Mikados)
- Total produced: 7
- Rebuilder: Wabash Railroad Decatur Illinois Shops
- Rebuild date: 1943–1947 (Rebuilt : To Class P1)
- Number rebuilt: 7
Specifications
- Configuration
  - Whyte: 4-6-4(formerly 2-8-2)
  - UIC: 2′C2′ h2S
- Gauge: 4 ft 8 1/2 in (1,435 mm) standard gauge
- Leading dia.: 36 in (914 mm)
- Driver dia.: 80 in (2,032 mm)
- Trailing dia.: 42 in (1,067 mm)
- Length: 87 ft 5 in (26.64 m)
- Width: 10 ft 8 in (3.25 m)
- Height: 16 ft 0 in (4.88 m)
- Axle load: 72,009 lb (32,663 kg; 32.663 t)
- Loco weight: 374,690 lb (169,960 kg; 169.96 t)
- Total weight: 582,680 lb (264,300 kg; 264.30 t)
- Fuel type: Coal
- Fuel capacity: 32,000 lb (15,000 kg; 15 t)
- Water cap.: 12,000 US gal (45,000 L; 10,000 imp gal)
- Firebox
  - Grate area: 71 sq ft (6.6 m^{2})
- Boiler pressure: 220 lbf/in^{2} (1.52 MPa)
- Heating surface: 4,225 sq ft (392.5 m^{2})
- Superheater
  - Heating area: 1,051 sq ft (97.6 m^{2})
- Cylinders: Two
- Cylinder size: 26 in × 28 in (660 mm × 711 mm)
Performance figures
- Tractive effort: 44,244 lbf (196.8 kN)
Career
- Operators: Wabash Railroad
- Numbers: 700–704 (formerly 2600-2604 Class K5 rebuilt to Class P1 700-704) 705-706 (formerly 2743-2744 Class K4 rebuilt to Class P1 705-706)
- Retired: 1956
- Disposition: All scrapped by 1956

The Wabash Railroad's class P-1 comprised seven 4-6-4 steam locomotives rebuilt from 5 Class K-5 2-8-2's numbered 2600-2604 and 2 Class K-4 2-8-2's numbered 2743 and 2744 .

The first five were constructed in 1943 and 1944 using the boilers from their unsuccessful K-5 class three-cylinder 2-8-2 locomotives that had been built by the American Locomotive Company's Schenectady works in 1925.

Two additional locomotives were converted in 1946 and 1947 using a pair of K-4 class 2-8-2s as donors at the Decatur Shops in Illinois .

The engines were semi-streamlined with long "elephant ear" smoke deflectors, and painted blue with a broad white stripe trimmed in red down the side of the locomotive and on the steam dome; the tenders received a similar paint job. The locomotives’ number was painted on the tender, and in later years the flag logo was applied to the deflectors. They ran until 1956.

== Models ==
Scale models exist of the P-1s, most notably in O gauge by MTH and Lionel. An HO (1:87) version was available in brass from Hallmark Models.
