= Illinois Central No. 1 =

Locomotive

Type and origin
- Power type: Steam
- Builder: Lima Locomotive Works
- Build date: 1926
- Rebuilder: Illinois Central Railroad
- Rebuild date: 1937
- Number rebuilt: 1
Specifications
- Configuration
  - Whyte: 4-6-4
  - UIC: 2′C2′ h
- Gauge: 4 ft 8 1/2 in (1,435 mm) standard gauge
- Driver dia.: 73 1/2 in (1,867 mm)
- Adhesive weight: 248,000 lb (112,000 kilograms; 112 metric tons)
- Loco weight: 388,000 lb (176,000 kilograms; 176 metric tons)
- Firebox
  - Grate area: 100 sq ft (9.3 m^{2})
- Boiler pressure: 270 lbf/in^{2} (1.86 MPa)
- Heating surface
  - Firebox: 414 sq ft (38.5 m^{2})
  - Total surface: 5,164 sq ft (479.8 m^{2})
- Superheater
  - Heating area: 2,111 sq ft (196.1 m^{2})
- Cylinders: Two
- Cylinder size: 27 in × 30 in (686 mm × 762 mm), later 24 in × 30 in (610 mm × 762 mm)
- Valve gear: Walschaerts
Performance figures
- Tractive effort: 68,288 lbf (303.8 kN), later 53,956 lbf (240.0 kN)
- Factor of adh.: 3.63, later 4.60
Career
- Operators: Illinois Central Railroad
- Numbers: 1, renumbered 2499 in 1945
- Retired: 1949
- Disposition: Scrapped

Illinois Central Railroad No. 1 was a 4-6-4 "Hudson" type steam locomotive built in 1937 at the Illinois Central Railroad's shops from an older 2-8-4 "Berkshire" locomotive. It was designed to pull longer and faster freight trains, but the locomotive was unable to do so, since it was prone to wheel slippage. No. 1 was rebuilt to resolve the slippage issues, and it spent its final years in service pulling passenger trains.

== History ==
In 1937, No. 1 was constructed at the Illinois Central Railroad's (IC) own Paducah, Kentucky shops from Illinois Central 7000 class 2-8-4 "Berkshire" No. 7038 as an experiment to haul fast freight trains. Freight traffic had been growing too large for the IC's 4-6-2 "Pacific" types, and they required more speed than the railroad's 2-8-2 locomotives could manage. The 2-8-4 class No. 1 was rebuilt from were prone to rough riding while traveling above 40 miles per hour (64 km/h).

The experiment was deemed unsuccessful. The No. 1 locomotive was prone to wheel slippage, since its factor of adhesion was too low—it was unable to obtain a proper grip on the rails. John L. McIntyre, the IC road foreman of locomotives at Clinton, Illinois where No. 1 was assigned during the 1938–1939 period, made some modifications to No. 1, including to the weight equalization across the locomotive's wheels and to reduce the cylinder diameter from 27 to 24 inches (686 to 610 mm).

The latter was to reduce the starting tractive effort to a level the locomotive's grip on the rails could handle. The improvements were successful, but the IC opted not to convert anymore locomotives to No. 1's specifications. The rest of the 7000 class 2-8-4s were rebuilt, but they retained their wheel arrangements, and the last were retired in the early-mid 1950s. In 1945, No. 1 was renumbered to 2499 and assigned to passenger service between Louisville and Fulton, Kentucky. It was retired from service in 1949, and it was dismantled for scrap shortly thereafter.
