= LT&SR 2100 Class =

Class of British steam locomotives

LT&SR 2100 class
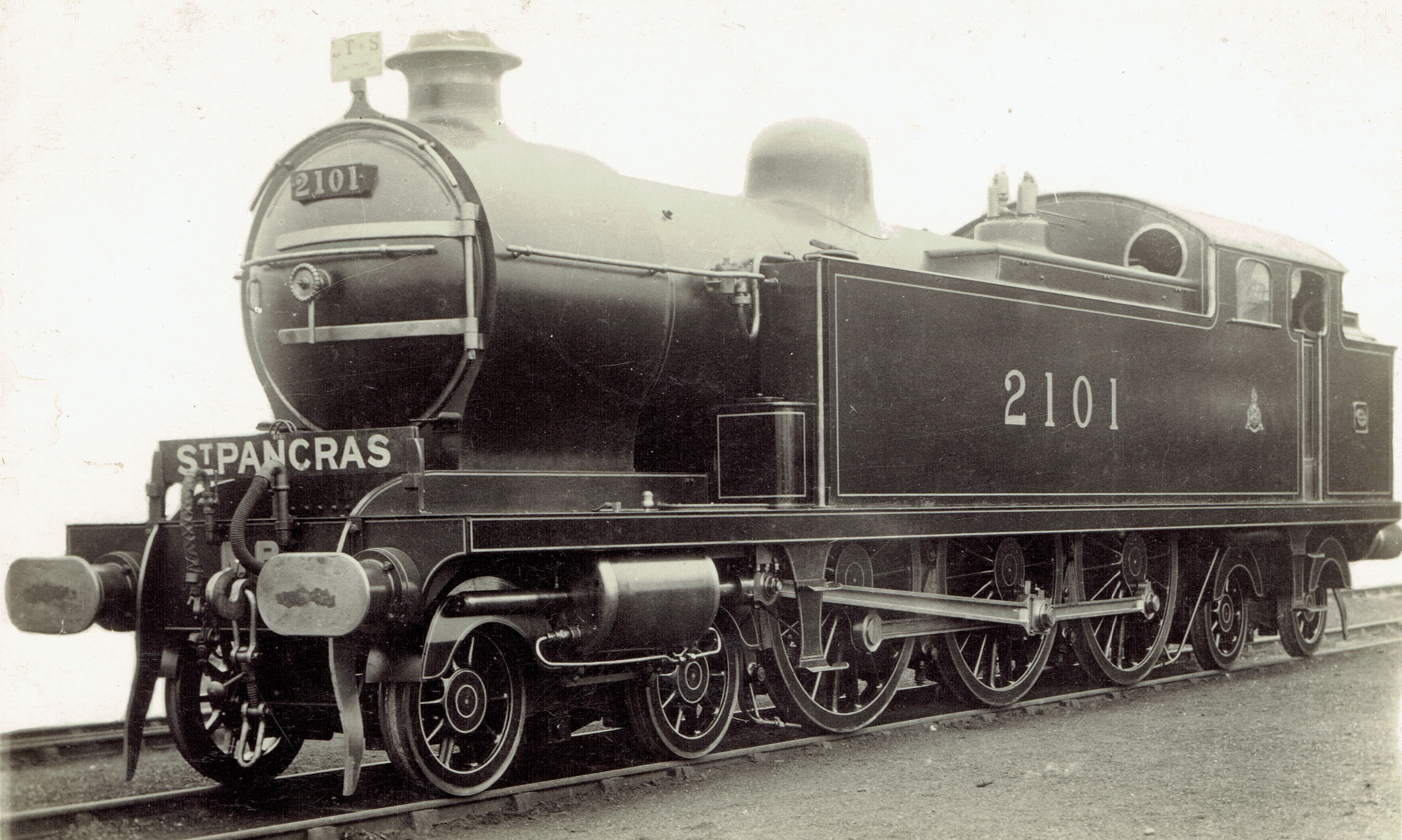
Type and origin
- Power type: Steam
- Designer: Robert Harben Whitelegg
- Builder: Beyer, Peacock & Co.
- Serial number: 5608–5615
- Build date: 1912
- Total produced: 8
Specifications
- Configuration
  - Whyte: 4-6-4T
  - UIC: 2′C2′ t
- Gauge: 4 ft 8 1/2 in (1,435 mm)
- Driver dia.: 6 ft 3 in (1.905 m)
- Loco weight: 94.60 long tons (96.12 t)
- Boiler pressure: 160 psi (1.10 MPa)
- Cylinders: Two
- Cylinder size: 20 in × 26 in (508 mm × 660 mm)
- Valve gear: Stephenson
Performance figures
- Tractive effort: 18,859 lbf (83.9 kN)
Career
- Operators: Midland Railway; →London, Midland and Scottish Railway
- Power class: 3P
- Numbers: MR: 2100–2107
- Withdrawn: 1929–1934
- Disposition: All scrapped

The London, Tilbury and Southend Railway (LT&SR) 2100 Class was a class of 4-6-4T steam locomotives. Eight were built in 1912 to the design of Robert Harben Whitelegg. Initially, they were to be designated as the 87 Class, but as the Midland Railway took over the LT&SR that same year, they were given new numbers, becoming 2100–2107 under the Midland system with a power classification of 3P. None received a name. All subsequently passed into LMS ownership in 1923 and were all withdrawn and scrapped between 1929 and 1934.
