= Natal Government Railways Class K locomotives =

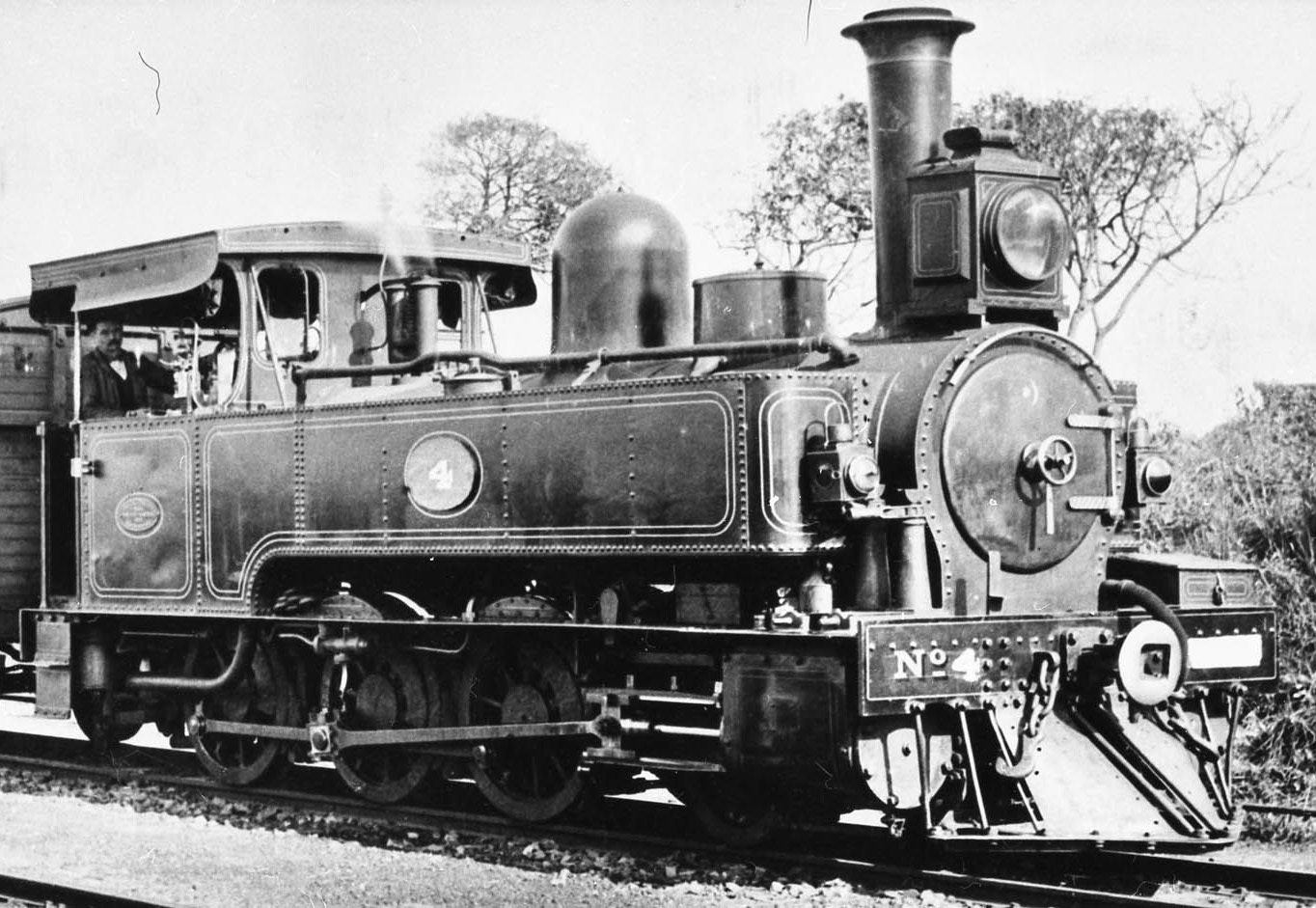
NGR Class K 2-6-0T

The Natal Government Railways Class K locomotives include three locomotive types, all designated Class K irrespective of differences in wheel arrangement.

When the Union of South Africa was established on 31 May 1910, the three Colonial government railways (Cape Government Railways, Natal Government Railways and Central South African Railways) were united under a single administration to control and administer the railways, ports and harbours of the Union. Those Class K locomotives which still survived, were considered obsolete by the new South African Railways and renumbered with an "0" prefix to their existing engine numbers.

0-4-0 wheel arrangement

- NGR Class K 0-4-0ST (Saddle-tank)

0-6-0 wheel arrangement

- NGR Class K 0-6-0ST (Saddle-tank)

2-6-0 wheel arrangement

- NGR Class K 2-6-0T (Side-tank)
