= South African Class C 4-6-0T =

1879 design of steam locomotive

NGR Kitson 2-6-0T NGR Class G 4-6-0T South African Class C 4-6-0T
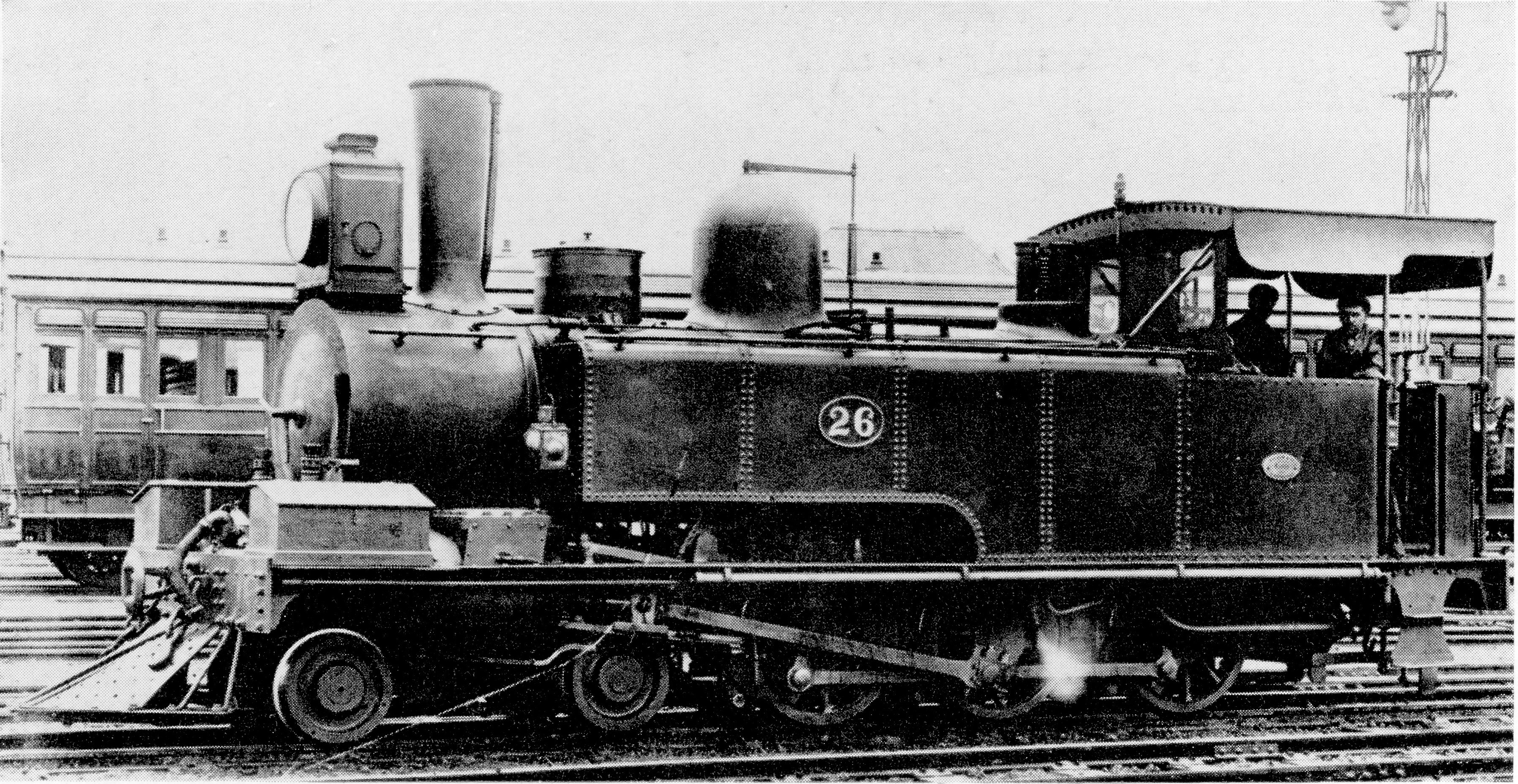
- NGR Class G no. 26
Type and origin
- ♠ - 2-6-0T configuration, as built ♥ - 4-6-0T configuration, modified or as built
- Power type: Steam
- Designer: Kitson & Company
- Builder: Kitson & Company; Robert Stephenson & Company
- Serial number: Kitson 2254-2258, 2269-2270, 2358-2360, 2504-2508, 2898-2900; Stephenson 2484-2490, 2519-2520, 2571-2580
- Model: NGR Class G
- Build date: 1879-1885
- Total produced: 37
- Rebuilder: Natal Government Railways
- Rebuild date: 1883, 1896 & 1902
- Number rebuilt: 1883: 7 to 4-6-0T (Ten-wheeler); 1896: 1 to 4-6-4T (Baltic); 1902: 1 to 4-6-2T (Pacific)
Specifications
- Configuration
  - Whyte: ♠ 7 built as 2-6-0T (Mogul) ♥ 30 built as 4-6-0T (Ten-wheeler)
  - UIC: ♠ 7 built as 1’Cn2t ♥ 30 built as 2’Cn2t
- Driver: 2nd coupled axle
- Gauge: 3 ft 6 in (1,067 mm) Cape gauge
- Leading dia.: ♠ 24 in (610 mm) ♥ 25 3/4 in (654 mm)
- Coupled dia.: ♠ 38 in (965 mm) ♥ 39 in (991 mm)
- Wheelbase: ♠ 14 ft 1 in (4,293 mm) ♥ 16 ft 8 1/4 in (5,086 mm)
  - Axle spacing (Asymmetrical): 1-2: 3 ft 7 1/2 in (1,105 mm); 2-3: 4 ft 1 1/2 in (1,257 mm)
  - Leading: ♥ 5 ft (1,524 mm)
  - Coupled: 7 ft 9 in (2,362 mm)
- Length
  - Over couplers: ♠ 24 ft (7,315 mm) ♥ 26 ft 3/4 in (7,944 mm)
  - Over beams: ♠ 21 ft 9 5/8 in (6,645 mm) ♥ 23 ft 10 3/8 in (7,274 mm)
- Height: 11 ft 7 1/4 in (3,537 mm)
- Frame type: Plate
- Axle load: ♥ 8 LT 4 cwt (8,332 kg)
  - Leading: ♥ 5 LT 18 cwt (5,995 kg)
  - 1st coupled: ♥ 7 LT 14 cwt (7,824 kg)
  - 2nd coupled: ♥ 8 LT 4 cwt (8,332 kg)
  - 3rd coupled: ♥ 7 LT 6 cwt (7,417 kg)
- Adhesive weight: ♥ 23 LT 4 cwt (23,570 kg)
- Loco weight: ♥ 29 LT 2 cwt (29,570 kg)
- Fuel type: Coal
- Fuel capacity: ♠ 1 LT 5 cwt (1.3 t) ♥ 1 LT (1.0 t)
- Water cap.: 700 imp gal (3,180 L)
- Firebox
  - Type: Round-top
  - Grate area: 11 sq ft (1.0 m^{2})
- Boiler
  - Pitch: 5 ft 7 in (1,702 mm)
  - Diameter: 3 ft 4 3/4 in (1,035 mm)
  - Tube plates: 10 ft 3 1/2 in (3,137 mm)
  - Small tubes: 130: 1 3/4 in (44 mm)
- Boiler pressure: ♠ 140 psi (965 kPa) ♥ 175 psi (1,207 kPa) reboilered
- Safety valve: Salter and Ramsbottom
- Heating surface
  - Firebox: 58 sq ft (5.4 m^{2})
  - Tubes: 611 sq ft (56.8 m^{2})
  - Total surface: 669 sq ft (62.2 m^{2})
- Cylinders: Two
- Cylinder size: 14 in (356 mm) bore 21 in (533 mm) stroke
- Valve gear: Stephenson
- Valve type: Slide
- Couplers: Johnston link-and-pin AAR knuckle (1930s)
Performance figures
- Tractive effort: ♠ 11,080 lbf (49.3 kN) @ 75% ♥ 13,850 lbf (61.6 kN) @ 75%
Career
- Operators: Natal Government Railways; South African Railways; Eskom
- Class: NGR Class G, SAR Class C
- Number in class: NGR 37, SAR 15
- Numbers: NGR 8-14, 16-26, 29-47; SAR 62-76
- Delivered: 1879-1885
- First run: 1879
- Withdrawn: 1940

The South African Railways Class C 4-6-0T of 1879 was a steam locomotive from the pre-Union era in the Colony of Natal.

Between 1879 and 1885, the Natal Government Railways placed thirty-seven 4-6-0 Ten-wheeler type tank steam locomotives in service. Of these, the first seven were built as 2-6-0T Mogul type locomotives and were subsequently modified to a 4-6-0T wheel arrangement. By 1908 they were designated Class G and in 1912, when some of the survivors were assimilated into the South African Railways, they were renumbered and reclassified to Class C. These were the oldest pre-Union locomotives to be classified and renumbered onto the SAR roster.

== Origins ==
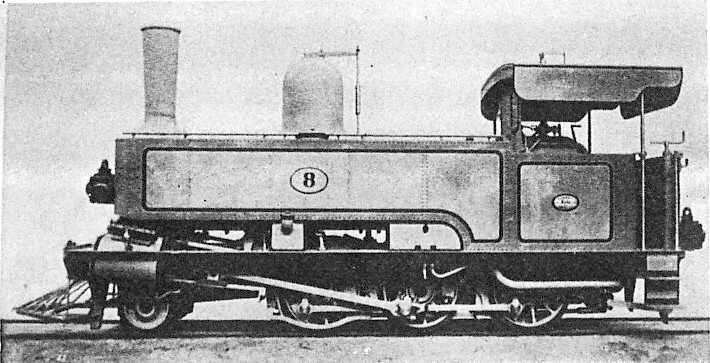
Works picture of NGR Class G no. 8

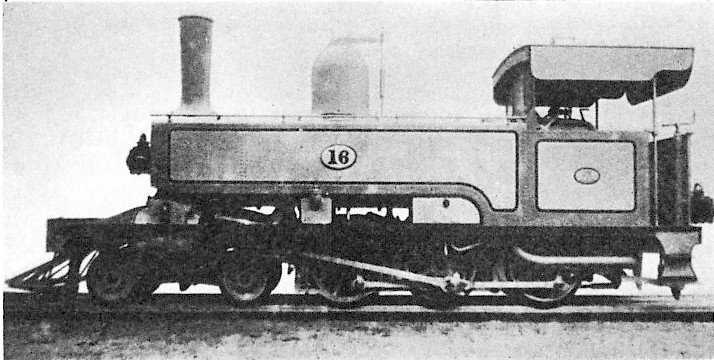
Works picture, NGR Class G no. 16

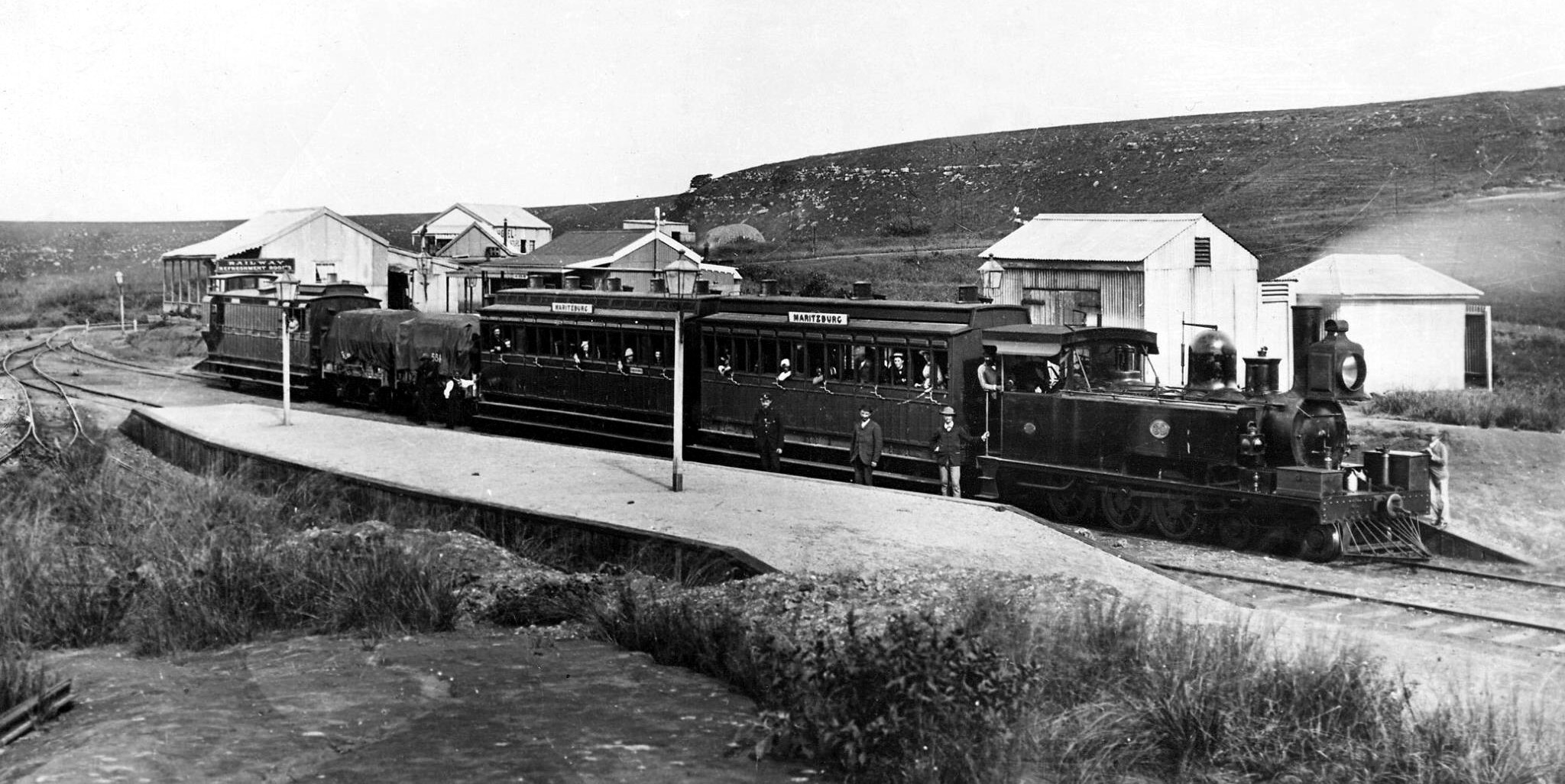
K&S Class no. 30 at Botha's Hill station with a Maritzburg-bound train, c. 1883

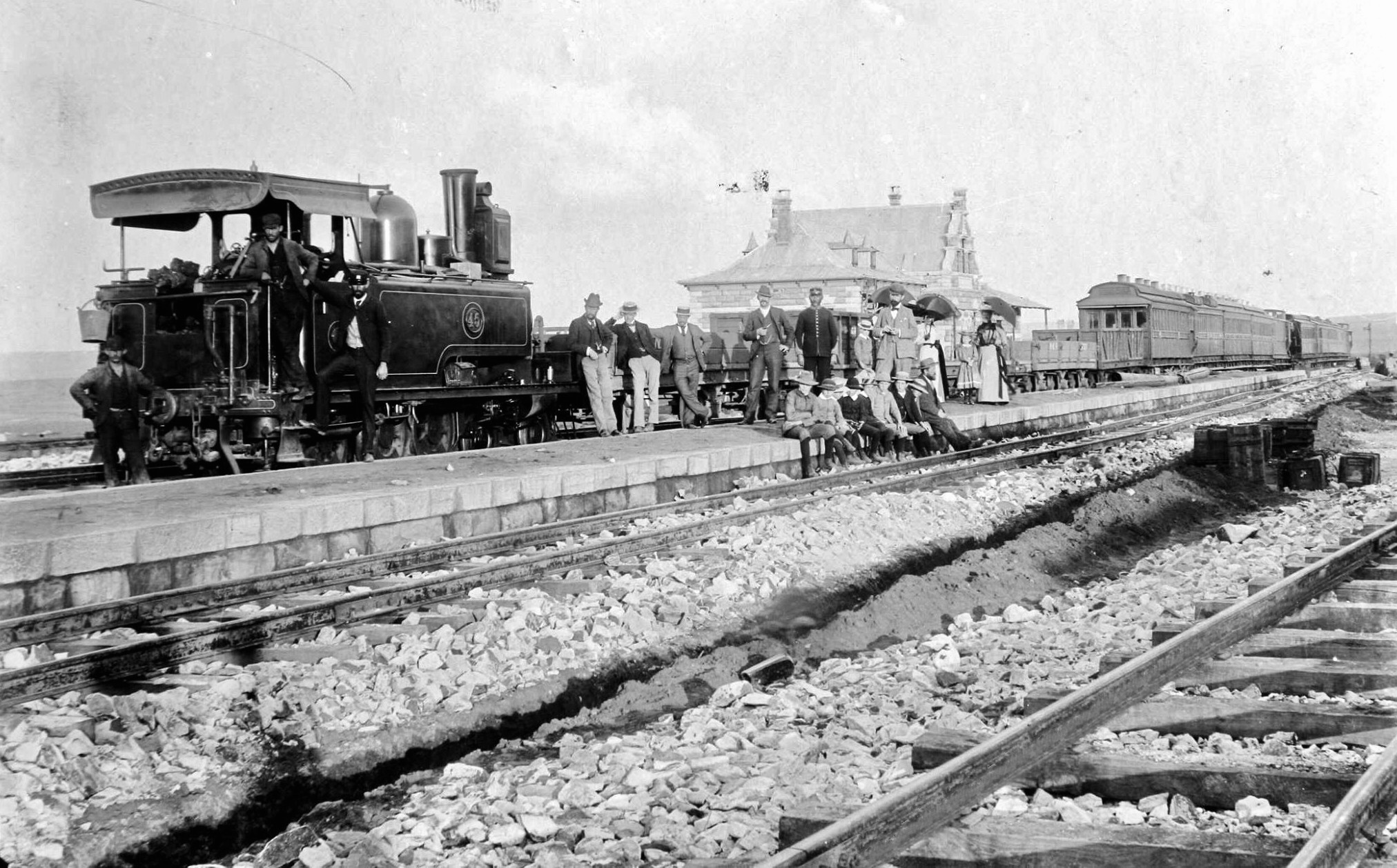
NGR Class G no. 45, later SAR Class C no. 70, at Heidelberg Station in November 1895

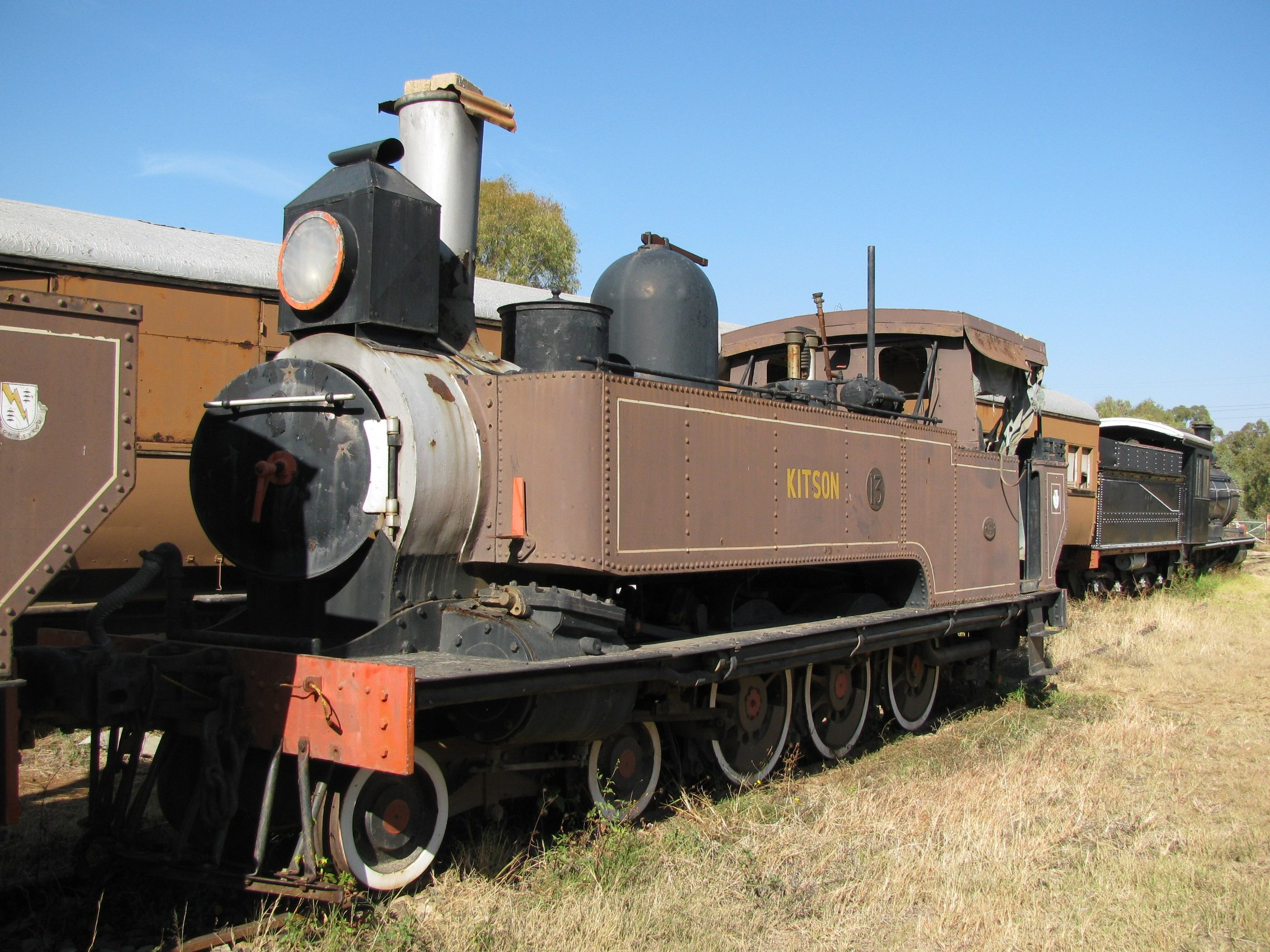
ESKOM's Kitty, preserved at the South African National Railway And Steam Museum in June 2009

In 1875, when the Natal Government took over all the assets of the Natal Railway Company and formed the Natal Government Railways (NGR), two important decisions were made. The first was to extend the tracks inland from Durban to Pietermaritzburg to open up the line into the interior, and to Verulam on the North Coast and Isipingo on the South Coast to serve the growing farming communities up and down the coast from Durban. The second was to convert the railway from broad gauge to Cape gauge to conform to the gauge used by the Cape Government Railways. Apart from eventual compatibility with the Gape's railways, this decision to regauge was probably equally much brought about by the terrain which confronted the new railway in the Natal interior, which would demand heavy grades and tight curves.

The first Cape gauge locomotives of the NGR were seven Class K 2-6-0T engines which had been ordered from Beyer, Peacock & Company in 1877 to meet the expected traffic demands on these new lines. They were built to the same specifications as the engines Durban and Pietermaritzburg, a pair of 2-6-0T locomotives which were built by Kitson & Company for Wythes and Jackson, the contractors who built the line between Durban and Pietermaritzburg.

== Manufacturers ==
These locomotives of 1879 were a development of those first Cape gauge Class K 2-6-0 tank locomotives. These new locomotives were initially often referred to as the K&S Class after their builders, Kitson & Company and Robert Stephenson & Company, until a classification system was introduced by the NGR at some stage between 1904 and 1908 and they were designated the NGR Class G. Altogether 37 were built by these two manufacturers, in six batches between 1879 and 1885.

1879

The first seven of these locomotives were delivered from Kitson in 1879, with works numbers in the range from 2254 to 2258, 2269 and 2270. They were numbered in the range from 8 to 14. Like their predecessor Class K, these seven locomotives were built with a 2-6-0T Mogul type wheel arrangement. They were all soon rebuilt to a 4-6-0 Ten-wheeler type wheel arrangement, probably beginning in 1882, since mention is made in the NGR Annual Report for 1883 of five locomotives of the 1879 order having been rebuilt in this manner during the year covered in the report. In the process, the locomotive frame had to be extended forward by 24 3/4 inches (629 millimetres) to accommodate the four-wheeled bogie.

1880

Three more locomotives followed in 1880, also built by Kitson, with works numbers in the range from 2358 to 2360 and numbered in the range from 16 to 18. These three as well as all those which followed, were built with a 4-6-0 Ten-wheeler type wheel arrangement. In order to accommodate the bogie, these and the following locomotives were all 23 feet 10 3/8 inches (7,274 millimetres) long over their buffer beams, compared to the 21 feet 9 5/8 inches (6,645 millimetres) length of the locomotives of 1879.

1882

Twelve more followed in 1882, of which five were built by Kitson, with works numbers in the range from 2504 to 2508 and numbered in the range from 22 to 26. The rest were built by Robert Stephenson & Company, with works numbers in the range from 2484 to 2490. Their known engine numbers (see table below) indicate that they were not numbered in chronological order and that some of them were allocated numbers from earlier locomotives which may have been withdrawn or renumbered.

1883

Two locomotives were delivered in 1883, built by Stephenson with works numbers 2519 and 2520. Their known numbers also indicate renumbering and gap-filling on the locomotive numbering roster.

1884

Ten locomotives were delivered in 1884, built by Stephenson, with works numbers in the range from 2571 to 2580 and numbered in the range from 32 to 41.

1885

The last three were built by Kitson, with works numbers in the range from 2898 to 2900 and numbered in the range from 42 to 44.

== Characteristics ==
The locomotive was able to haul a maximum load of 90 long tons (91.4 tonnes) on 1 in 30 (3⅓%) grades with curves of 300 feet (91 metres) radius.

Two small two-axle water tenders with a 6 feet (1,829 millimetres) wheelbase for use on long runs were supplied by Kitson. Another two-axle tender with a 7 feet (2,134 millimetres) wheelbase was built in the Durban workshops in 1882, to the design of Locomotive Superintendent William Milne. In contrast to the Cape Government Railways (CGR), where tender locomotives were acquired for mainline work from the outset, the NGR persisted with side-tank locomotives on mainline work in spite of their inherent limited coal and water capacities until 1904.

== Modifications ==
Several modifications were done to many of these locomotives during their years in service. This led to differences between locomotives in one or more of several aspects.

- The sandbox location was either on the running boards or atop the boiler.
- The size and shape of their side-tanks.
- The size and shape of their steam chest inspection covers.
- Longer boilers, which resulted in smokeboxes being relocated further forward.
- Frame lengths, extended forward on the 1879 batch to accommodate the bogie, or extended rearward to accommodate extended footplates.
- Larger coupled wheel diameters.
- Increased operating boiler pressure and, as a result, increased tractive effort.
- Increased coal bunker capacity.

All the locomotives were delivered with Salter safety valves. Photographs show that at some stage Ramsbottom safety valves were installed in addition to the existing Salter valves.

== Rebuilding ==
=== To 4-6-4T Baltic ===
Two of these locomotives were rebuilt by G.W. Reid, who was appointed as Locomotive Superintendent of the NGR on 1 July 1893. No. 21 was rebuilt to a 4-6-4T Baltic type wheel arrangement in 1896, for use on the South Coast line. At the time, there was no turning facility at the end of this line and the modification was made to enable the locomotive to run equally well in either direction. This locomotive was later renumbered 39 and designated NGR Class H.

=== To 4-6-2T Pacific ===
In 1901, no. 25 was rebuilt to a 4-6-2T Pacific type wheel arrangement. This locomotive was later renumbered 38 and was also designated NGR Class H when a classification system was introduced on the NGR.

== Service ==
=== Natal Government Railways ===
In NGR service, the Class G replaced the slightly smaller Beyer, Peacock & Company built Class K 2-6-0 tank locomotives on mainline trains out of Durban. They were occasionally used with the small four-wheeled tenders to increase their water carrying capacity when they were required to work long distances.

On Wednesday 1 December 1880 during the official opening of the line to Pietermaritzburg, a special train consisting of five carriages and a brake-van worked by Kitson 2-6-0 engine no. 12, all new stock, was run from Durban to Pietermaritzburg. The driver was Harry Hayes with guards Frazer and De Broize. The train conveyed a party of invited guests, including the Mayor of Durban, Town Councillors, several prominent citizens and government officials in addition to Mr David Hunter and other railway officers.

=== South African Railways ===
When the Union of South Africa was established on 31 May 1910, the three Colonial government railways (CGR, NGR and Central South African Railways) were united under a single administration to control and administer the railways, ports and harbours of the Union. Although the South African Railways and Harbours came into existence in 1910, the actual classification and renumbering of all the rolling stock of the three constituent railways was only implemented with effect from 1 January 1912.

In 1912, fifteen survivors of the Class G were designated the South African Railways (SAR) Class C and were renumbered in the range from 62 to 76. These were the oldest locomotives to be classified and renumbered onto the SAR roster. All older and several newer locomotive types which were in service at the time, were considered obsolete and were renumbered by having the numeral "0" prefixed to their existing numbers. In SAR service, the Class C locomotives were used as shunting engines until the last one was withdrawn from service in 1940.

=== Electricity Supply Commission ===
In post-SAR service, one of the ex 2-6-0T rebuilt locomotives, Kitson works number 2269 of 1879, was sold to the Victoria Falls and Transvaal Power Company soon after Union. The power company later became the Electricity Supply Commission (Eskom). While in Eskom's service, it was named Kitty after its builder, Kitson, and used at Eskom's power stations and eventually at their Rosherville workshops. The locomotive remained in service with Eskom until the mid-1980s, by which time it had rendered more than 105 years of service. It was declared a heritage object in 1983. The relevant gazette of the South African Heritage Resources Agency (SAHRA), no. 8682 of 29 April 1983, describes it as the oldest working steam locomotive in South Africa and the first to have completed a century of service. Initially earmarked to join the South African Railway Museum's National Collection in the 1970s, it was eventually housed in the private South African National Railway And Steam Museum (SANRASM) collection. This historic locomotive's current fate is unknown.

== Renumbering ==
The early locomotive numbering practices which were followed on the NGR still remain to be deciphered. It would appear that locomotives which were taken out of mainline service were renumbered into the 500 number range. Number slots which became vacant in this manner or as a result of locomotive withdrawal, sale or scrapping were then re-used, either by being allocated to new locomotives or by wholesale renumbering. The published number lists all appear to be snapshots at a point in time and none appear to present the complete picture. The numbers as listed in the table are from two sources, those presented by D.F. Holland in his publication of 1971 and those presented by R.V. Conyngham in his booklet of 1995. The two sources are indicated in the table headings by "DFH" or "RVC" respectively, with the differences between the two sources shaded yellow.

On two of the three SAR numbers where the Holland and Conyngham lists disagree, the official Classification of S.A.R. Engines with Renumbering Lists issued by the Chief Mechanical Engineer's Office, Pretoria, January 1912 seems to prove Holland correct, as shown shaded green in the Notes column in the table. This official document shows old and new numbers, but not builder's works numbers.

On the third disagreement, historic records show two locomotives which bore the number 47. Here, Conyngham is presumed to be correct, since the locomotive Kitty is known to have been built by Kitson, not Stephenson.

NGR Class G, SAR Class C 4-6-0T Builders, works numbers and renumbering
Builder	Works no.	Year built	NGR no. DFH	NGR no. RVC	NGR re-no. DFH	NGR re-no. RVC	SAR no. DFH	SAR no. RVC	Notes
Kitson	2254	1879	8	8	508	508	63		63
Kitson	2255	1879	9	9	509	509	71		
Kitson	2256	1879	10	10	20	20		63	
Kitson	2257	1879	11	11	513	513	64	64	
Kitson	2258	1879	12	12	514	514	65	65	
Kitson	2269	1879	13	13	47	47		62	Kitty
Kitson	2270	1879	14	14					
Kitson	2358	1880	17	16	48	48	66	66	
Kitson	2359	1880	18	17	506		67	67	
Kitson	2360	1880	19	18					
Stephenson	2489	1882	16	19	44	44	69	69	
Stephenson	2486	1882	20	20					
Stephenson	2487	1882	21	21	39	39	86	86	Class C2
Kitson	2504	1882	22	22					
Kitson	2505	1882	23	23					
Kitson	2506	1882	24	24					
Kitson	2507	1882	25	25	38	38	77	77	Class C1
Kitson	2508	1882	26	26					
Stephenson	2488	1882	29	29	41	41	68	68	
Stephenson	2490	1882	30	30	42	42	72	72	
Stephenson	2519	1883	31	31					
Stephenson	2571	1884	32	32					
Stephenson	2572	1884	33	33					
Stephenson	2573	1884	34	34					
Stephenson	2574	1884	35	35				74	
Stephenson	2575	1884	36	36					
Stephenson	2576	1884	37	37					
Stephenson	2577	1884	38	38					
Stephenson	2578	1884	39	39					
Stephenson	2579	1884	40	40			73	73	
Stephenson	2580	1884	41	41					
Kitson	2898	1885	42	42	510	510	75	75	
Kitson	2899	1885	43	43			74		74
Kitson	2900	1885	44	44	512	512	76	76	
Stephenson	2484	1882	45	45			70	70	
Stephenson	2485	1882	46	46					
Stephenson	2520	1883	47	47			62		
