= Pretoria-Pietersburg railway line =

The railway network of the South African Republic in 1899 (at the start of the Second Anglo-Boer War) with the Pretoria-Pietersburg railway line in red.

The Pretoria-Pietersburg railway line was built between 1897 and 1899 from Pretoria to Pietersburg (now Polokwane) by the Pretoria Pietersburg Railway Company with British capital. Five months after the railway was completed, the Second Anglo-Boer War broke out and the ZAR government took control of the railway.

After the war, it came under the control of the Central South African Railways.

== Construction ==
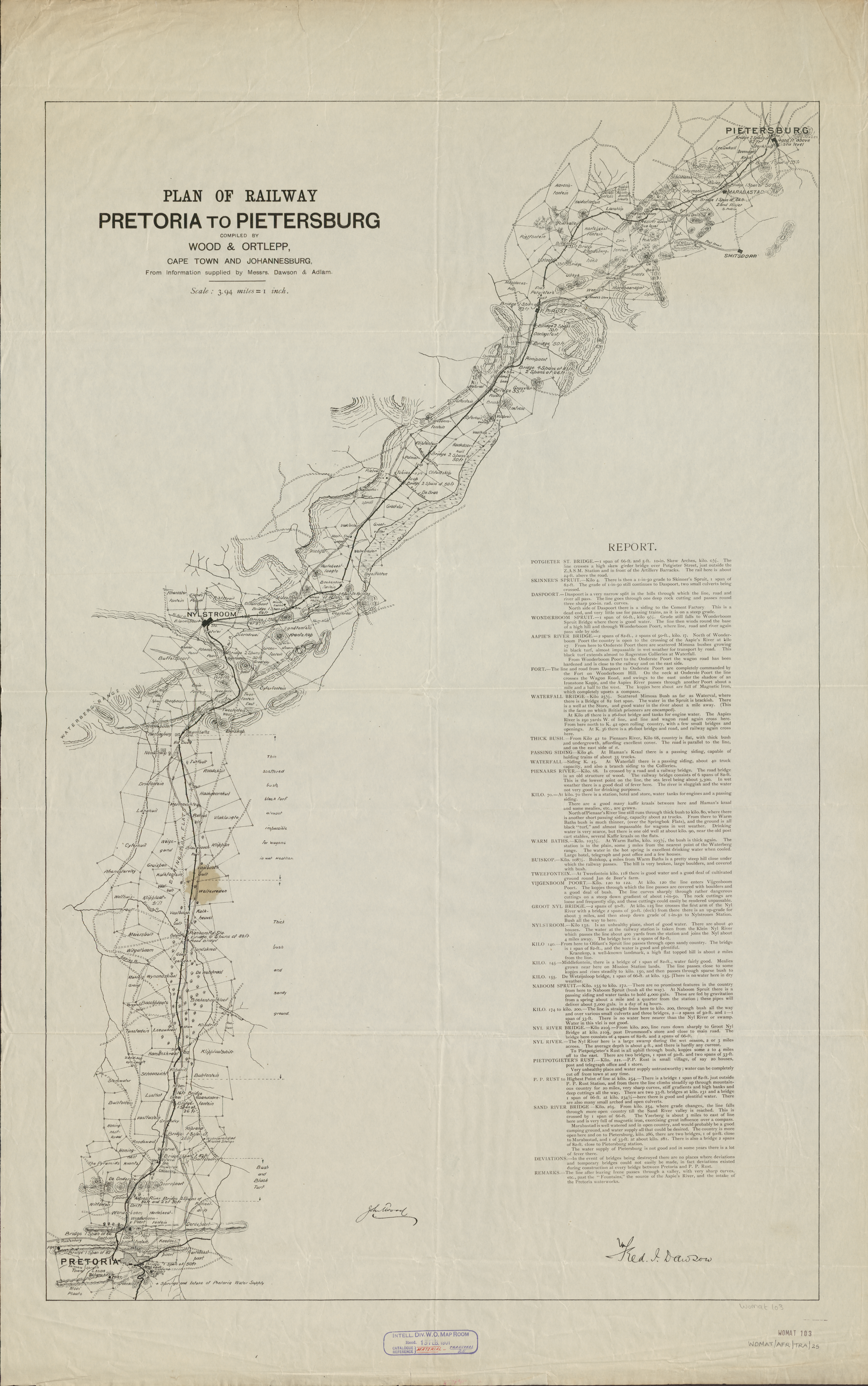
Map of the railway line

Construction started in 1897 and on 1 July 1898, the first 132 km between Pretoria and Nylstroom was opened. Three months later, the next 90 km between Nylstroom and Potgietersrus was opened and on 31 May 1899, the last 63 km between Potgietersrus and Pietersburg was opened. The railway begins at Pretoria Station, where it connects to the NZASM railway network. It passes the city to the west and follows the Apies River to Hammanskraal. As the Apies River and Pienaars River turn west, the railway continues northwards to Warmbad, where it ascends to Nylstroom. It then turns northeast and follows the Nyl River to Potgietersrus. From there, it crosses the Waterberg and descends to Pietersburg.

On 31 May 1902, when the railway came under British control, its official length was 176 miles and 58 chains (284.4 km).

== Second Anglo-Boer War ==
On 12 October 1899, a few months after the railway had been opened, the Second Anglo-Boer War broke out. The ZAR government took control of the railway and placed it under the management of the NZASM with Mauritz de Wildt as manager. De Wildt was also the chief engineer of NZASM at the time. After British forces under the command of Lord Roberts occupied Pretoria on 31 May 1900, the ZAR government moved to Machadodorp and railway carriages were used as government offices and also to store state archives.

After President Kruger left for Europe, the ZAR government moved to Pietersburg. Carriages on the Warmbad-Pietersburg section of the railway were used by the ZAR government until 30 March 1901. At the same time, repairs were made to the Pretoria Warmbad section of the line. On 1 April, Nylstroom was occupied by the Australian forces, Potgietersrus was occupied on 5 April, and Pietersburg was occupied on 8 April. The railway then came under the control of the Imperial Military Railways (IMR). In addition to normal railway services, the trains also provided a mobile post office service.

The IMR trains were attacked at least twice by Boer commandos. On 4 July 1901, a Boer commando under the command of General CF Beyers attacked a train at Tobiasspruit, 8 km north of Naboomspruit. On 10 August 1901, another Boer commando, this time under the command of Captain Jack Hindon and Captain Henri Slegtkamp, attacked an armoured train at Haartebeeslaagte, 11 km south of Naboomspruit. After the Treaty of Vereeniging (31 May 1902), the railway line came under the control of the Central South African Railways.

== Financing ==
In 1895, a concession was granted to Hendrik Jacobus Schoeman to build and operate the railway line. In 1896, the Pretoria-Pietersburg Railway Company Limited was founded with a capital of £500,000 in the United Kingdom and listed on the London Stock Exchange to operate the concession. Further financing was obtained by issuing bonds worth £1,005,400.

Between 31 May 1899 and 13 October 1899, 45,611 passengers and 7,402 tons of freight were transported by the railway. The income during this period was £25,858 and the expenditure (excluding interest on its bonds) was £22,227.

On 14 November 1903, the company was dissolved by the British Government. The British government refunded the shareholders their original capital and also paid for the company's assets. In terms of the Hague Convention (1898), compensation was paid to them for income guaranteed by the ZAR government. The amount due in taxes was eventually settled in the English High Court in 1908.

== Locomotives ==
The PPS ordered a total of 15 locomotives, but before the last four were delivered, the Second Boer War broke out, and the PPS merged with the NZASM. While the railway was under construction, four saddle tank locomotives were purchased for construction and shunting work. Three 26 tonner 0-6-0ST locomotives were purchased directly from the manufacturer, and one locomotive, a 0-4-0ST, was second-hand from the NGR. The PPS took delivery of six mainline locomotives – five 2-6-4T tank locomotives, which were newly purchased, and a second-hand 4-6-0T tank locomotive, which was bought from the Delagoa Bay Railway. A sixth 2-6-4T tank locomotive was lost during the sea voyage between the United Kingdom and Southern Africa. The replacement locomotive was delivered in 1900 at Lourenco Marques.

In 1898, three 4-8-0 tender locomotives were ordered. These locomotives, based on the 7th Class of the Cape Government Railways, were delivered to the Imperial Military Railways in 1900. In 1898, a 46-ton locomotive was also obtained from NZASM. It was named "Prinsloo."

Year	Quantity	PPS Number	Configuration	PPS Type/Name	SAS Type	Tractive Power		Manufacturer
Year	Quantity	PPS Number	Configuration	PPS Type/Name	SAS Type	kN	lbf	Manufacturer
1896	3	-	0-6-0ST	26 Tonner ("Pretoria", "Pietersburg" & "Nylstroom")	-	44	9,800	Hawthorn-Leslie & Co
1897	1	-	4-6-0T	35 tonner "The Portuguese Tank"	-	42	9,354	Nasmyth, Wilson & Co
1898	1	-	0-6-4T	46 Tonner ("Prinsloo")	Class B	73.8	16,580	Maschinenfabrik Esslingen
1898	1	-	0-4-0ST	"Natal"	-	25	5,526	Neilson, Reid & Co
1897	6	1-6	2-6-4T	55 Tonner (No. 1: "President Kruger")	Class D	69.4	15,610	Beyer, Peacock & Co
1898 (Note: These locomotives were delivered to the Imperial Military Railways in 1900)	3	7-9	4-8-0		Class 7B	83	18,660	Neilson, Reid & Co.

Notes

Images of the Pretoria-Pietersburg Railway
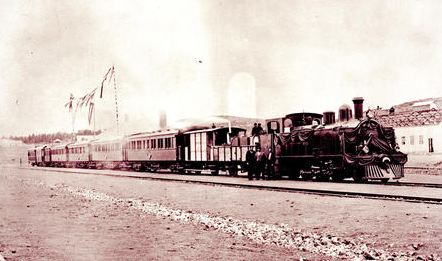
Opening of the railway on 31 May 1899

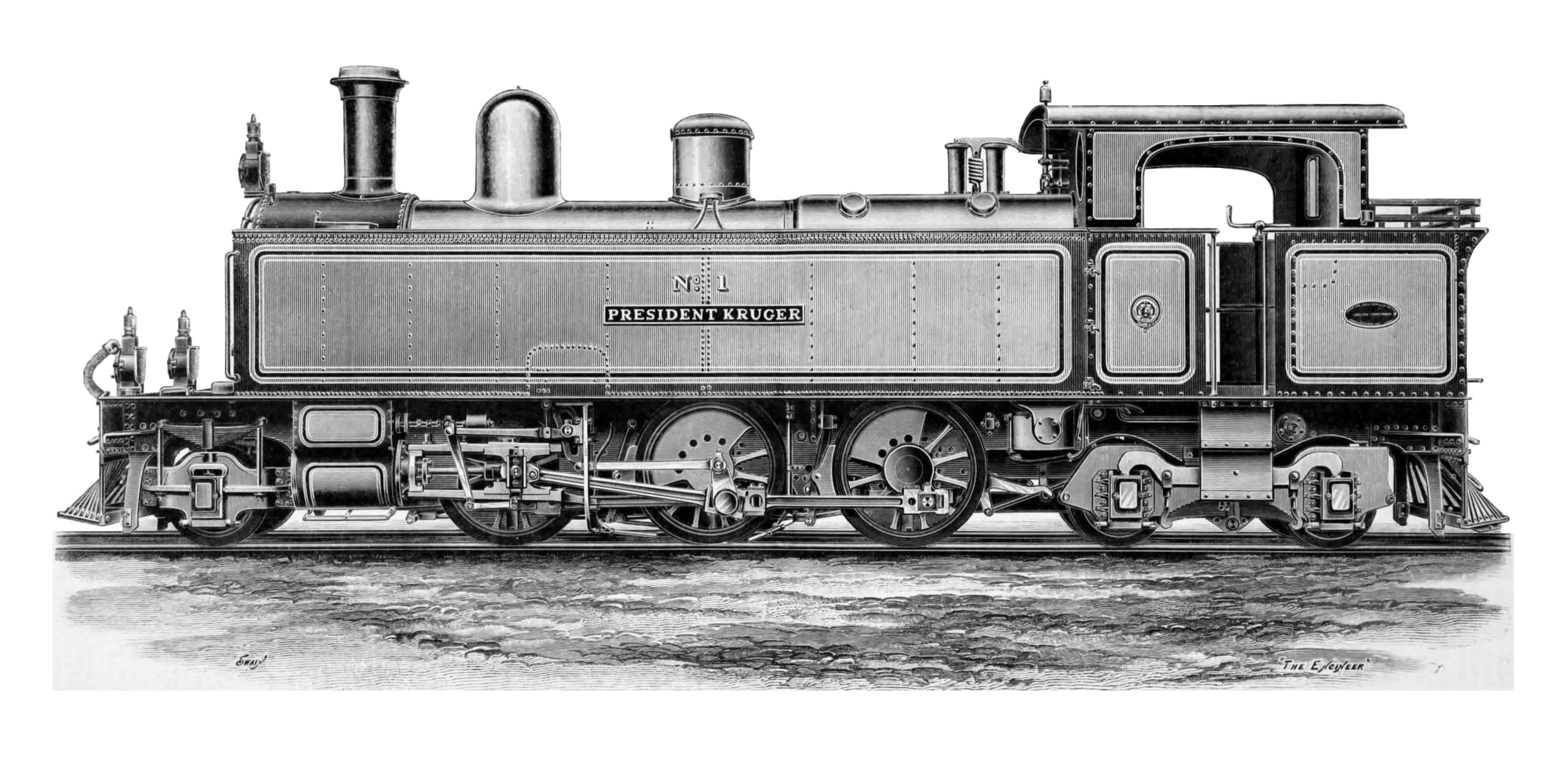
PPS Locomotive "President Kruger"

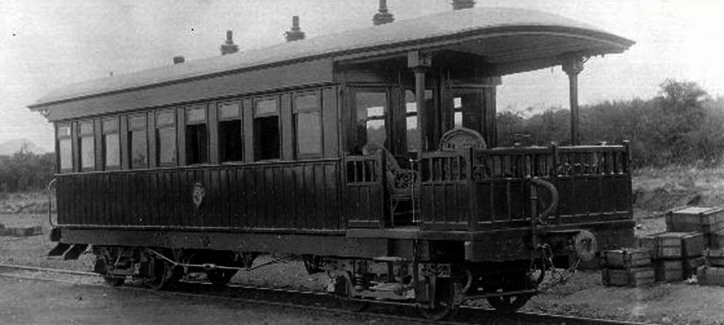
Private passenger coach of the PPS

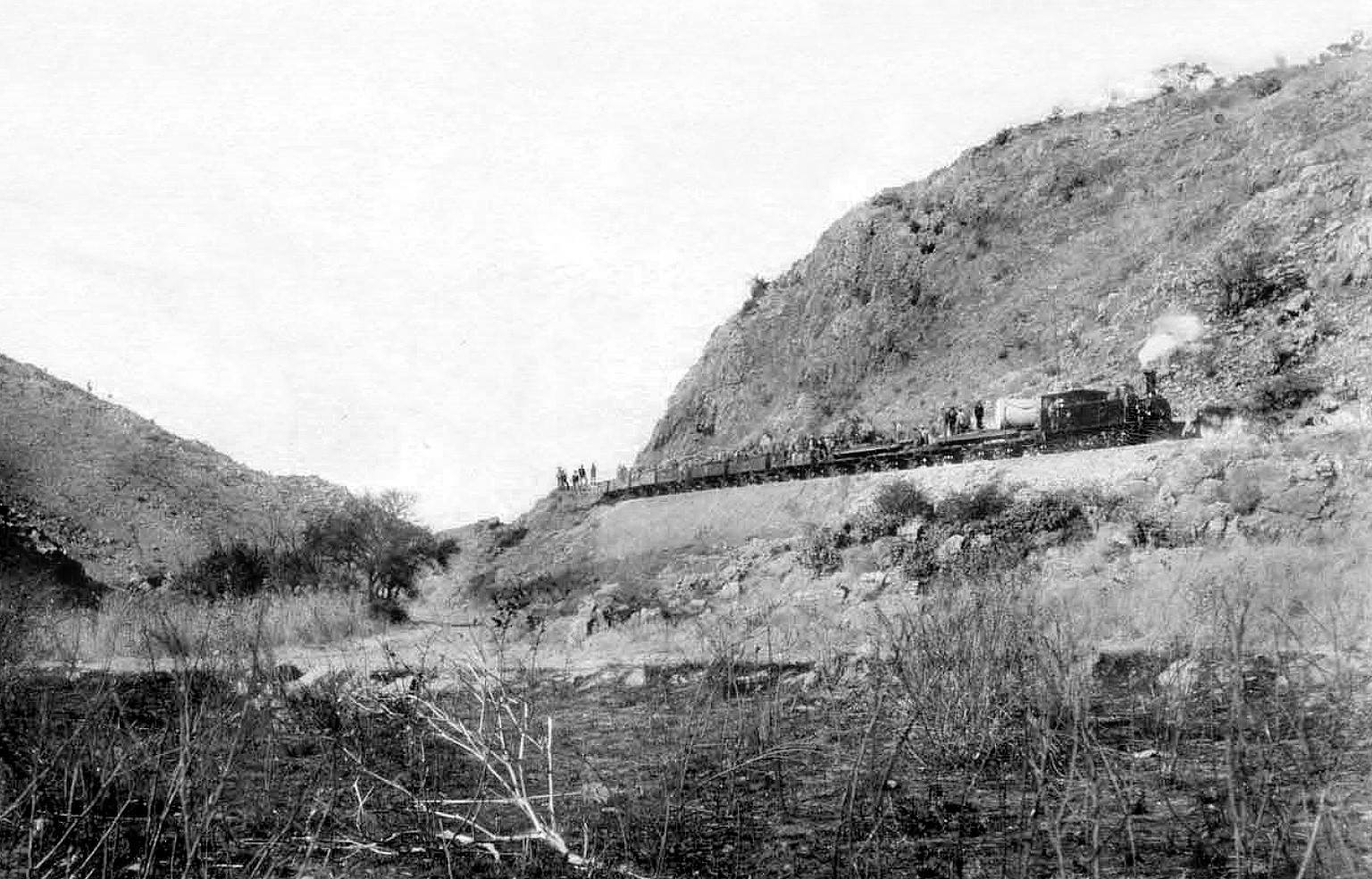
PPS train at Wonderboompoort drawn by the "Portuguese Tank"
