= South African Class C1 4-6-2T =

1901 design of steam locomotive

NGR Class H 4-6-2T South African Class C1 4-6-2T
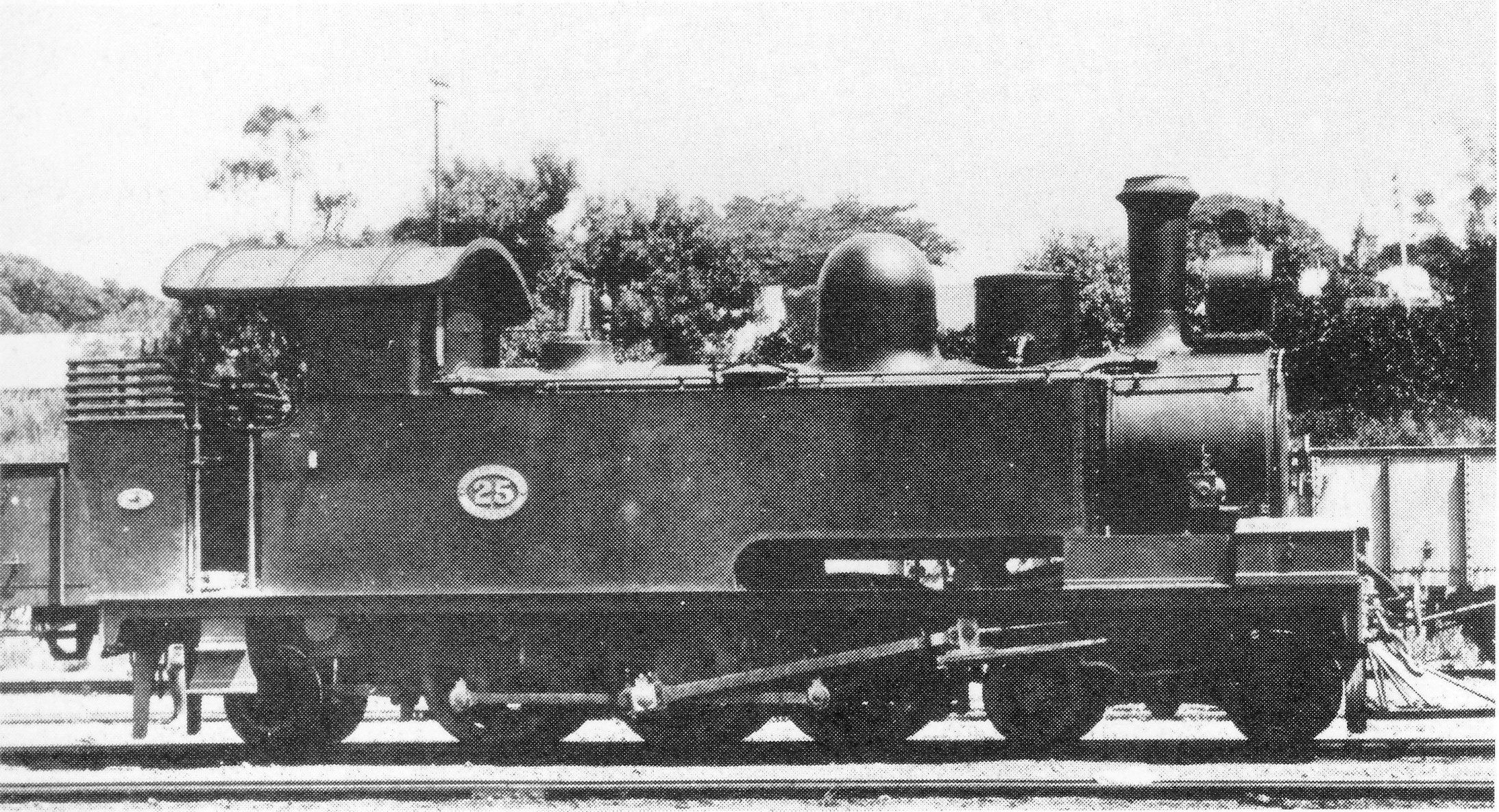
- NGR Class H no. 25, renumbered 38; SAR Class C1 no. 77
Type and origin
- Power type: Steam
- Designer: Kitson and Company; Natal Government Railways
- Builder: Kitson and Company; Natal Government Railways; South African Railways
- Serial number: Kitson 2507, SAR none
- Model: NGR Class H
- Build date: 1901, 1912
- Total produced: 5
Specifications
- Configuration
  - Whyte: 4-6-2T (Pacific)
  - UIC: 2'C1'n2t
- Driver: 2nd coupled axle
- Gauge: 3 ft 6 in (1,067 mm) Cape gauge
- Leading dia.: 25 3/4 in (654 mm)
- Coupled dia.: 39 in (991 mm)
- Trailing dia.: 25 3/4 in (654 mm)
- Wheelbase: 21 ft 8 1/4 in (6,610 mm)
  - Axle spacing (Asymmetrical): 1-2: 3 ft 7 1/2 in (1,105 mm); 2-3: 4 ft 1 1/2 in (1,257 mm)
  - Leading: 5 ft (1,524 mm)
  - Coupled: 7 ft 9 in (2,362 mm)
- Length
  - Over couplers: 28 ft 9 3/4 in (8,782 mm)
- Height: 11 ft 7 1/2 in (3,543 mm)
- Frame type: Plate
- Axle load: 9 LT 4 cwt (9,348 kg)
  - Leading: 5 LT 16 cwt (5,893 kg)
  - 1st coupled: 8 LT 16 cwt (8,941 kg)
  - 2nd coupled: 9 LT 4 cwt (9,348 kg)
  - 3rd coupled: 8 LT 9 cwt (8,586 kg)
  - Trailing: 6 LT 7 cwt (6,452 kg)
- Adhesive weight: 26 LT 9 cwt (26,870 kg)
- Loco weight: 38 LT 12 cwt (39,220 kg)
- Fuel type: Coal
- Fuel capacity: 2 LT 5 cwt (2.3 t)
- Water cap.: 1,070 imp gal (4,860 L)
- Firebox
  - Type: Round-top
  - Grate area: 13.8 sq ft (1.28 m^{2})
- Boiler
  - Pitch: 5 ft 10 1/2 in (1,791 mm)
  - Diameter: 3 ft 8 1/8 in (1,121 mm)
  - Tube plates: 10 ft 3 in (3,124 mm)
  - Small tubes: 173: 1 3/4 in (44 mm)
- Boiler pressure: 160 psi (1,103 kPa)
- Heating surface
  - Firebox: 68.26 sq ft (6.342 m^{2})
  - Tubes: 818.32 sq ft (76.024 m^{2})
  - Total surface: 886.58 sq ft (82.366 m^{2})
- Cylinders: Two
- Cylinder size: 14 in (356 mm) bore 21 in (533 mm) stroke
- Valve gear: Stephenson
- Couplers: Johnston link-and-pin
Performance figures
- Tractive effort: 12,660 lbf (56.3 kN) @ 75%
Career
- Operators: Natal Government Railways; South African Railways
- Class: NGR Class H, SAR Class C1
- Number in class: NGR 1, SAR 5
- Numbers: NGR 25, renumbered 38; SAR 77, 325-328
- Delivered: 1882
- First run: 1901
- Withdrawn: 1931

The South African Railways Class C1 4-6-2T of 1901 was a steam locomotive from the pre-Union era in the Natal Colony.

Between 1879 and 1885, the Natal Government Railways placed 37 4-6-0 Tenwheeler type tank steam locomotives in service. In 1901, one of them was rebuilt to a 4-6-2T Pacific type locomotive and in 1912, when it was assimilated into the South African Railways, it was renumbered and designated Class C1. During 1912, four more of these 4-6-2T locomotives were built by the South African Railways in the Durban workshops, using mostly surplus material.

== Manufacturers ==
The Natal Government Railways (NGR) Class G 4-6-0 tank locomotives, initially known as the K&S Class after their builders, Kitson and Stephenson, were delivered between 1879 and 1884. They had plate frames and used Stephenson valve gear.

== Rebuilding ==
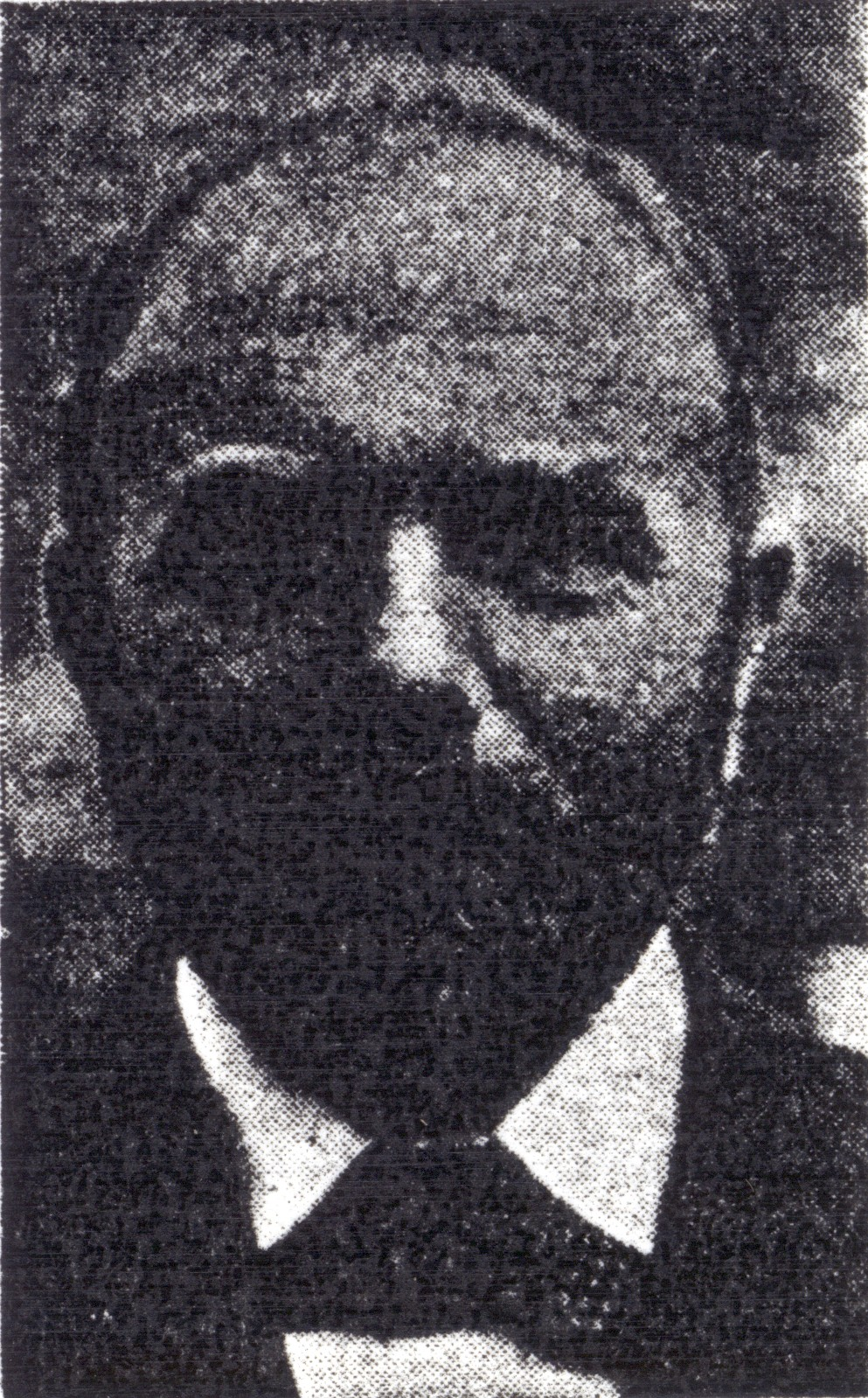
G.W. Reid

In 1901, NGR Locomotive Superintendent George William Reid rebuilt one of the Kitson batch of 1882, no. 25, to a 4-6-2 Pacific type wheel arrangement for suburban passenger working on the South Coast line. The NGR later renumbered this locomotive to 38, but it remained known as a K&S type in NGR service until a classification system was introduced at some stage between 1904 and 1908, when it was designated NGR Class H.

The rebuilding resulted in a heavier locomotive, with its weight increased from 29 long tons 2 hundredweight (29,570 kilograms) to 38 long tons 12 hundredweight (39,220 kilograms). It had a 5 feet (1,524 millimetres) longer wheelbase and was 2 feet 9 inches (838 millimetres) longer over the couplers. A larger coal bunker increased its fuel carrying capacity from 1 long ton (1.0 tonne) to 2 long tons 5 hundredweight (2.3 tonnes), while larger water tanks increased its capacity from 700 to 1,070 imperial gallons (3,180 to 4,860 litres). It was also equipped with a larger boiler, with the operating pressure increased from 140 to 160 pounds per square inch (965 to 1,103 kilopascals).

== South African Railways ==
When the Union of South Africa was established on 31 May 1910, the three Colonial government railways (Cape Government Railways, NGR and Central South African Railways) were united under a single administration to control and administer the railways, ports and harbours of the Union. Although the South African Railways and Harbours came into existence in 1910, the actual classification and renumbering of all the rolling stock of the three constituent railways were only implemented with effect from 1 January 1912.

In 1912, this locomotive was designated Class C1 by the South African Railways (SAR) and renumbered 77. The rebuilt locomotive ran well and gave such good service that, also in 1912, the SAR built a further four Class C1 locomotives in the Durban workshops, mostly from spare parts and surplus material. These four were numbered in the range from 325 to 328.

== Service ==
The Class C1 was used on suburban passenger working until more powerful locomotives became necessary. They were then relegated to shunting work at various depots until they were withdrawn from service in 1931 and scrapped.
