= South African Class C2 4-6-4T =

1896 design of steam locomotive

NGR Class H 4-6-4T South African Class C2 4-6-4T
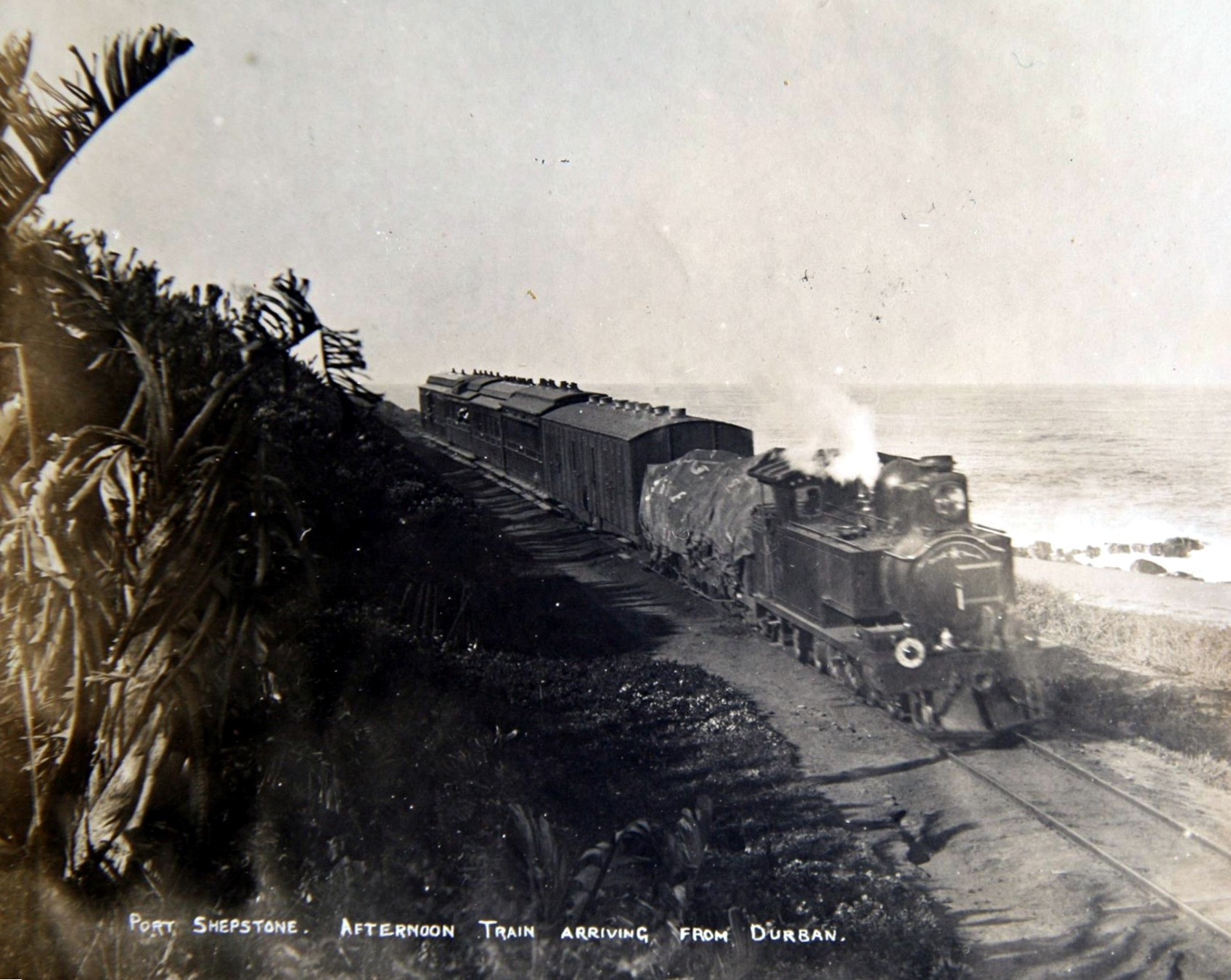
- NGR Class H 4-6-4T no. 39 arriving at Port Shepstone with the afternoon train from Durban, c. 1905
Type and origin
- Power type: Steam
- Designer: Kitson and Company
- Builder: Robert Stephenson and Company; Natal Government Railways
- Serial number: 2487
- Model: NGR Class H
- Build date: 1896
- Total produced: 1
Specifications
- Configuration
  - Whyte: 4-6-4T (Baltic)
  - UIC: 2'C2'n2t
- Driver: 2nd coupled axle
- Gauge: 3 ft 6 in (1,067 mm) Cape gauge
- Leading dia.: 25 3/4 in (654 mm)
- Coupled dia.: 39 in (991 mm)
- Trailing dia.: 25 3/4 in (654 mm)
- Wheelbase: 25 ft 7 1/4 in (7,804 mm)
  - Axle spacing (Asymmetrical): 1-2: 3 ft 7 1/2 in (1,105 mm); 2-3: 4 ft 1 1/2 in (1,257 mm)
  - Leading: 5 ft (1,524 mm)
  - Coupled: 7 ft 9 in (2,362 mm)
  - Trailing: 5 ft (1,524 mm)
- Length
  - Over couplers: 31 ft 5 1/4 in (9,582 mm)
- Height: 11 ft 7 1/2 in (3,543 mm)
- Frame type: Plate
- Axle load: 7 LT 18 cwt (8,027 kg)
  - Leading: 5 LT 10 cwt (5,588 kg)
  - 1st coupled: 7 LT (7,112 kg)
  - 2nd coupled: 7 LT 18 cwt (8,027 kg)
  - 3rd coupled: 7 LT 4 cwt (7,316 kg)
  - Trailing: 5 LT 10 cwt (5,588 kg)
- Adhesive weight: 22 LT 2 cwt (22,450 kg)
- Loco weight: 33 LT 2 cwt (33,630 kg)
- Fuel type: Coal
- Fuel capacity: 2 LT (2.0 t)
- Water cap.: 1,130 imp gal (5,140 L)
- Firebox
  - Type: Round-top
  - Grate area: 11 sq ft (1.0 m^{2})
- Boiler
  - Pitch: 5 ft 7 in (1,702 mm)
  - Diameter: 3 ft 2 7/8 in (987 mm)
  - Tube plates: 10 ft 3 1/2 in (3,137 mm)
  - Small tubes: 130: 1 3/4 in (44 mm)
- Boiler pressure: 145 psi (1,000 kPa)
- Safety valve: Ramsbottom
- Heating surface
  - Firebox: 58 sq ft (5.4 m^{2})
  - Tubes: 611 sq ft (56.8 m^{2})
  - Total surface: 669 sq ft (62.2 m^{2})
- Cylinders: Two
- Cylinder size: 14 in (356 mm) bore 21 in (533 mm) stroke
- Valve gear: Stephenson
- Couplers: Johnston link-and-pin
Performance figures
- Tractive effort: 11,480 lbf (51.1 kN) @ 75%
Career
- Operators: Natal Government Railways; South African Railways
- Class: NGR Class H, SAR Class C2
- Number in class: 1
- Numbers: NGR 21, renumbered 39; SAR 86
- Delivered: 1896
- First run: 1896
- Withdrawn: 1931

The South African Railways Class C2 4-6-4T of 1896 was a steam locomotive from the pre-Union era in the Colony of Natal.

Between 1879 and 1885, the Natal Government Railways placed 37 4-6-0 tank steam locomotives in service, which were later designated Class G. In 1896, one of them was rebuilt to the first known 4-6-4T Baltic type locomotive, later designated Class H. In 1912, when this rebuilt engine was assimilated into the South African Railways, it was renumbered and became its only Class C2 locomotive.

== Manufacturers ==
The Natal Government Railways (NGR) Class G 4-6-0 tank locomotives, sometimes known as the K&S Class after their builders, Kitson and Stephenson, were delivered between 1879 and 1884. They had plate frames and used Stephenson valve gear.

== Rebuilding ==
On 1 July 1896, George William Reid succeeded William Milne as Locomotive Superintendent of the NGR. Later in that year, he rebuilt one of the Stephenson-built batch of locomotives of 1882, no. 21, to a 4-6-4T wheel arrangement. In the process, the frame had to be extended to accommodate the trailing bogie and the coal bunker could be enlarged.

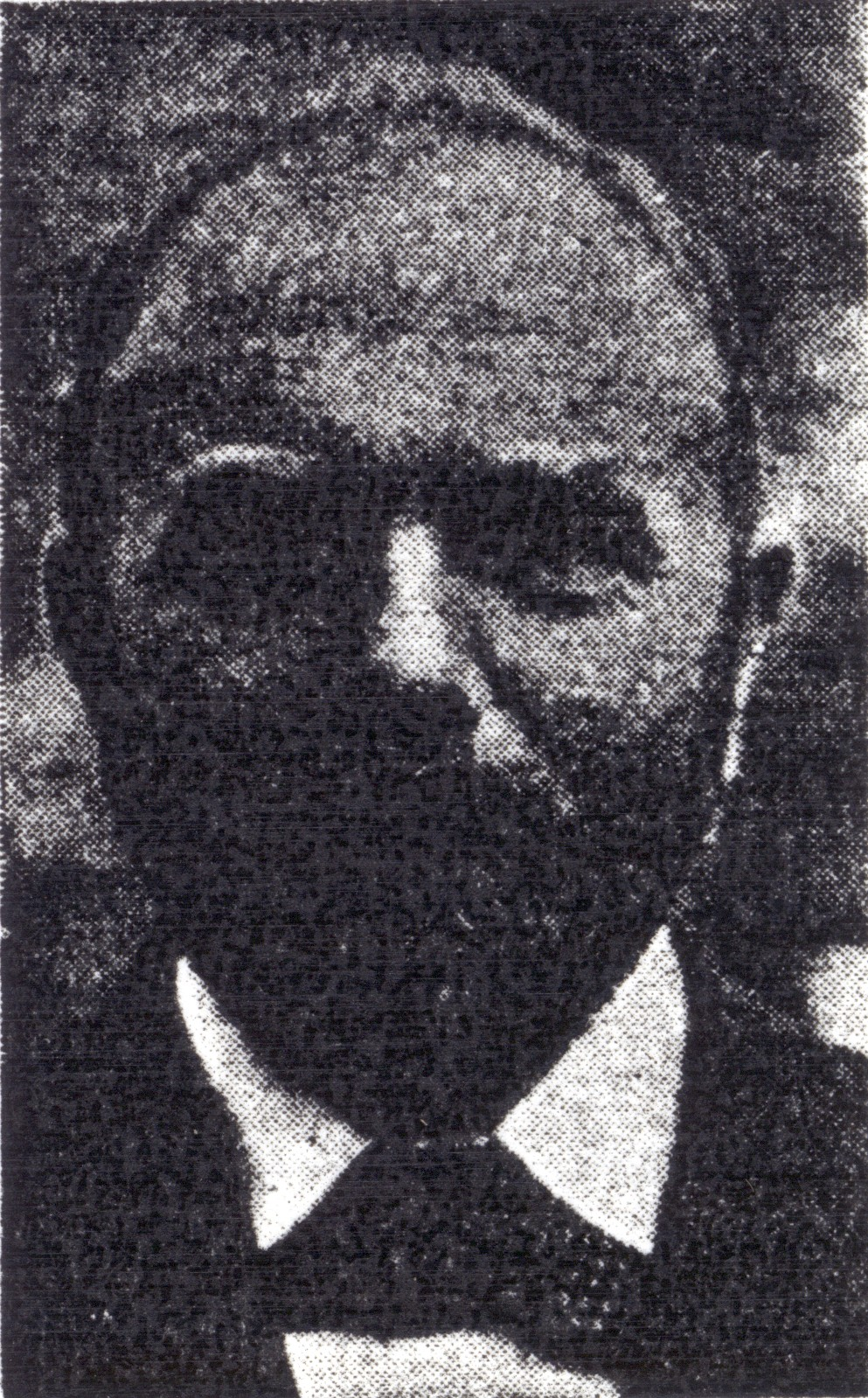
G.W. Reid

The locomotive was rebuilt for use in shuttle service on the South Coast line where, at the time, no turntable or triangle was available at the terminus. The modification was done to enable the locomotive to run equally well chimney or bunker forward.

As rebuilt, the locomotive was still equipped with both Salter and Ramsbottom safety valves. Contemporary photographs show that the Salter safety valves were later removed.

This locomotive was the first known in the world to have a 4-6-4 Baltic type wheel arrangement. Photographs show the rebuilt locomotive bearing NGR no. 1. The NGR later renumbered it to no. 39, but it remained known as a K&S type in NGR service until a classification system was introduced at some stage between 1904 and 1908, when it was designated Class H.

The rebuilding resulted in a heavier locomotive, with its weight increased from 29 long tons 2 hundredweight (29,567 kilograms) to 33 long tons 2 hundredweight (33,631 kilograms). It had an 8 feet 11 inches (2,718 millimetres) longer wheelbase and was 5 feet 4 1/2 inches (1,638 millimetres) longer over the couplers. A larger coal bunker increased its fuel carrying capacity from 1 long ton (1.0 tonne) to 2 long tons (2.0 tonnes), while larger water tanks increased its capacity from 700 to 1,130 imperial gallons (3,180 to 5,140 litres). The operating pressure of its boiler was reduced from 175 to 145 pounds per square inch (1,207 to 1,000 kilopascals).

== South African Railways ==
When the Union of South Africa was established on 31 May 1910, the three Colonial government railways (Cape Government Railways, NGR and Central South African Railways) were united under a single administration to control and administer the railways, ports and harbours of the Union. Although the South African Railways and Harbours came into existence in 1910, the actual classification and renumbering of all the rolling stock of the three constituent railways were only implemented with effect from 1 January 1912.

In 1912, this locomotive became the sole Class C2 engine on the South African Railways and was renumbered 86.

== Service ==
The Class C2 remained in use on branch line work on the South Coast line and was later relegated to shunting work. It was withdrawn from service in 1931.

== Illustration ==
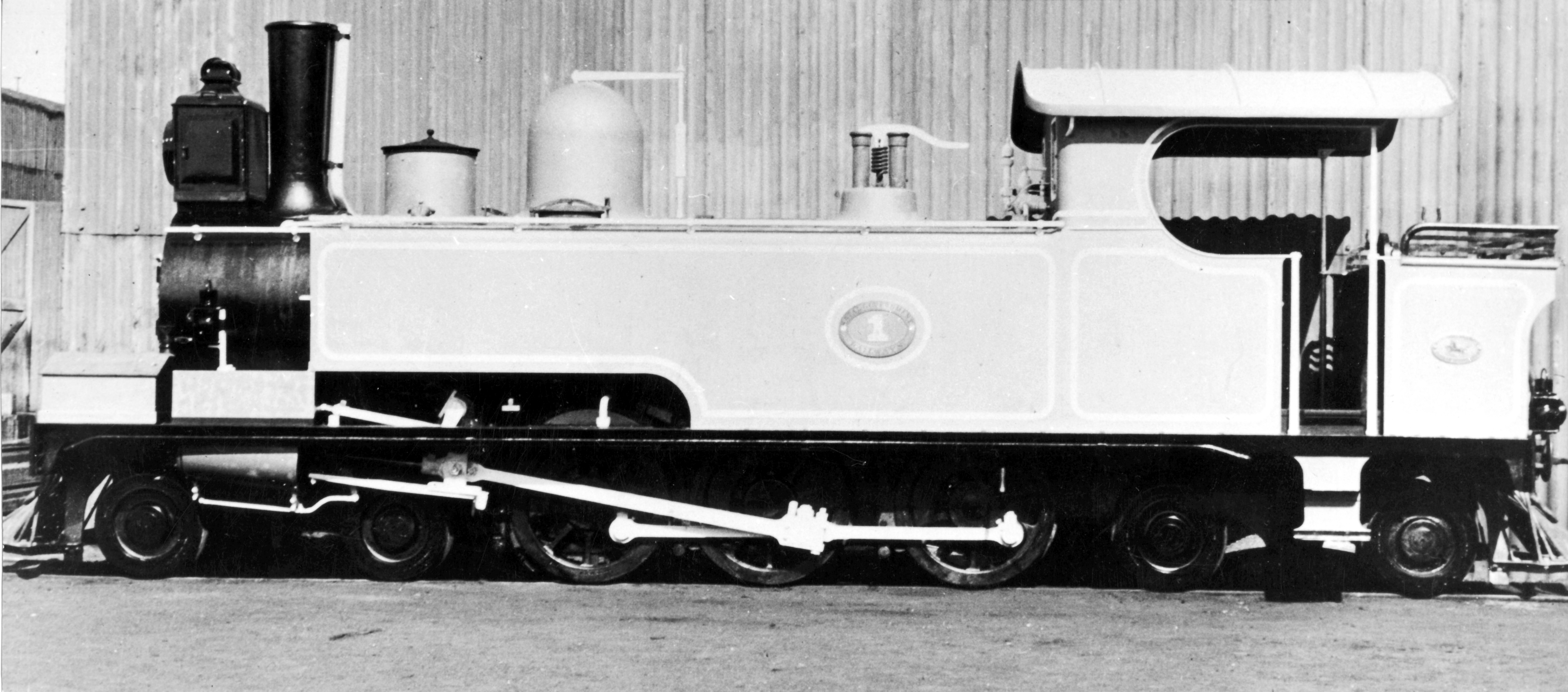
NGR works picture of the rebuilt locomotive with Salter and Ramsbottom safety valves and a large headlight, bearing NGR no. 1, c. 1896

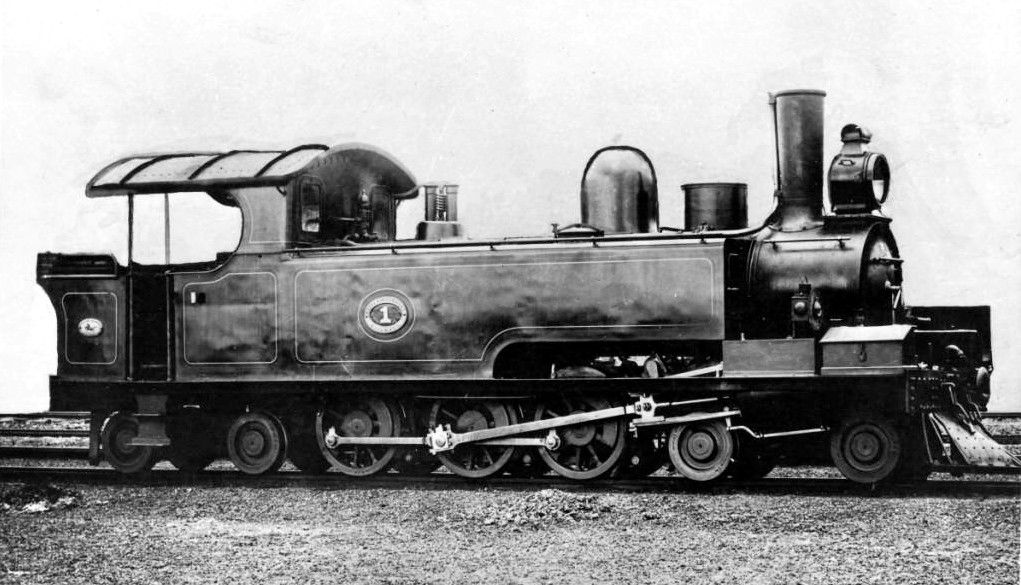
Locomotive NGR no. 1 with Ramsbottom safety valves and a smaller headlight

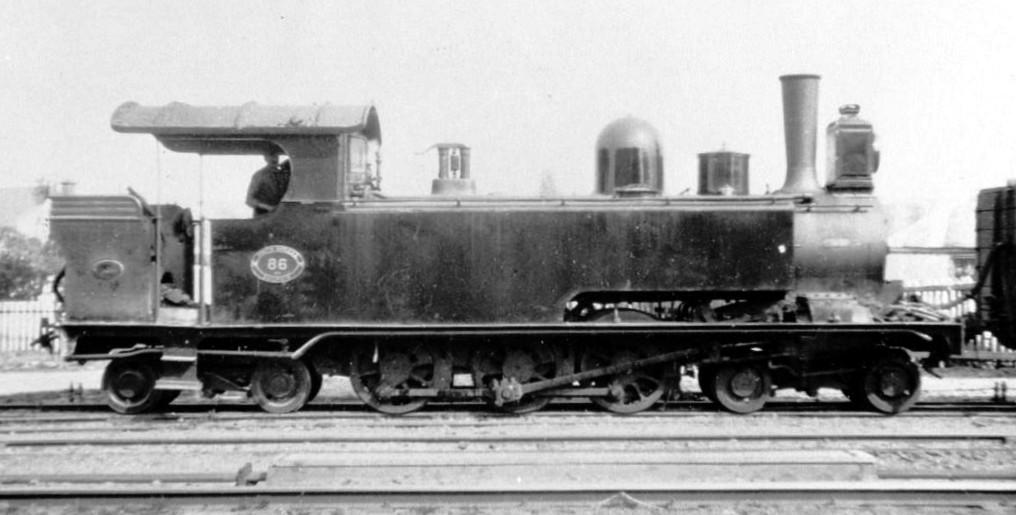
Class C2 locomotive in SAR service, once again with a large headlight and renumbered to SAR no. 86
