= South African National Railway And Steam Museum =

South African National Railway Museum

South African National Railway And Steam Museum (SANRASM) was meant to be the national railway museum authority of South Africa, by the original initiative of the RailRoad Association of South Africa (RRA) and then transport authority South African Railways and Harbours. SANRASM has three sites around the Krugersdorp and Randfontein area.

The Johannesburg site used to have a collection of approximately 90 steam engine locomotives, the largest museum of its kind in South Africa. The diverse collection of vehicles and artifacts cover photographs depicting the use of locomotives during the Boer War, to the last of the scheduled steam trains in 2007. The museum also coordinates trips on the Magaliesburg Express Fun Train.

During September 2010 South African rail historian Les Smith published a letter calling on SANRASM to take urgent action to stop illegal scrap metal merchants systematically cutting up the locomotives under SANRASM's care and arrangements were subsequently made for a team from Sandstone Estates to move recoverable items from Randfontein.
