= NGR Class K 2-6-0T =

Type of steam locomotive

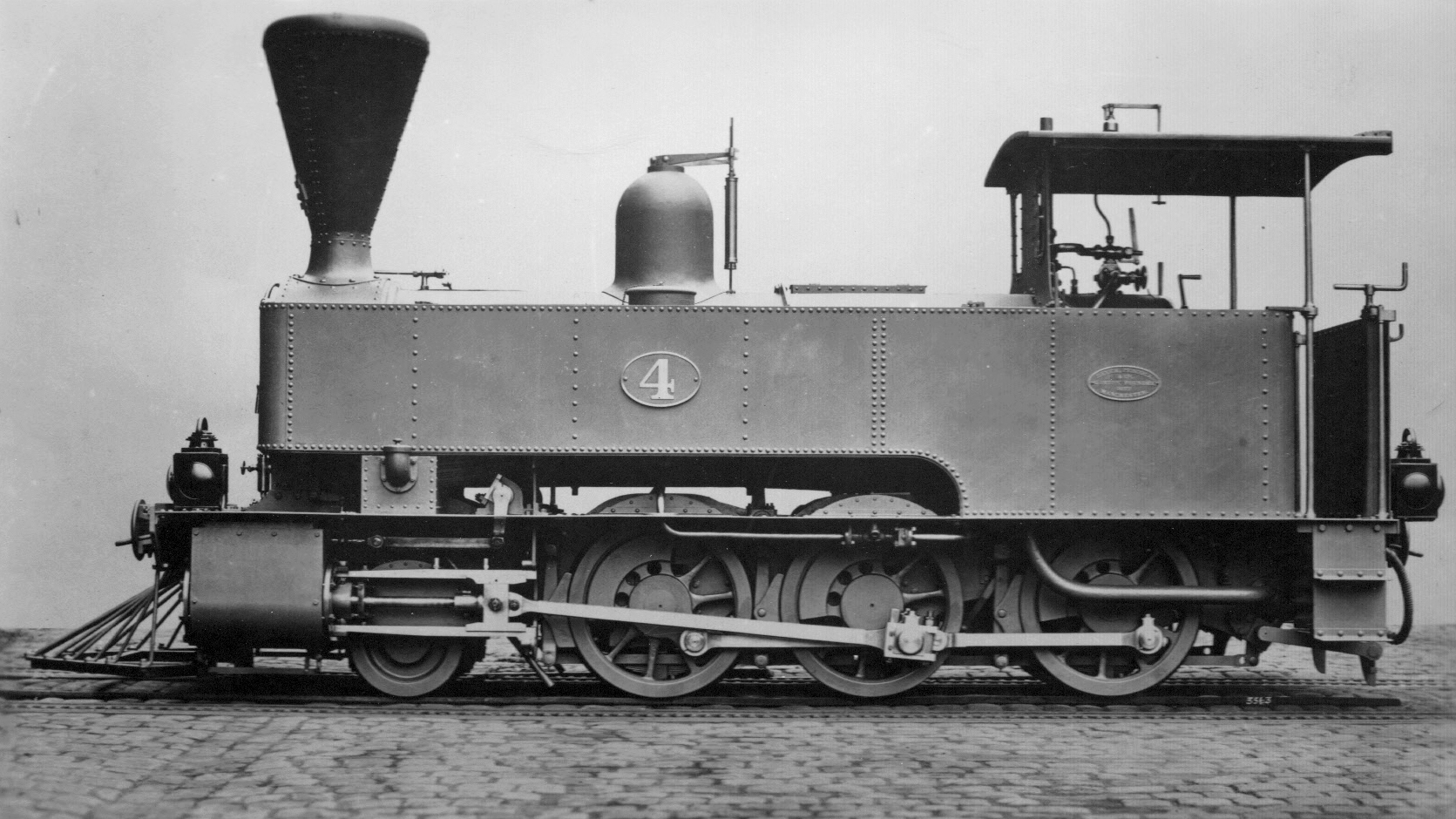
- NGR no. 4 with a balloon smokestack and Salter safety valves
Type and origin
- Power type: Steam
- Designer: Kitson & Company
- Builder: Beyer, Peacock & Company
- Serial number: 1702-1706 (1877), 1817-1818 (1878)
- Build date: 1877
- Total produced: 7
Specifications
- Configuration
  - Whyte: 2-6-0T
  - UIC: 1Cn2t
- Driver: 2nd coupled axle
- Gauge: 3 ft 6 in (1,067 mm) Cape gauge
- Leading dia.: 25 3/4 in (654 mm)
- Coupled dia.: 39 in (991 mm)
- Wheelbase: 12 ft 1 in (3,683 mm)
  - Axle spacing (Asymmetrical): 1-2: 3 ft 7 1/2 in (1,105 mm); 2-3: 4 ft 1 1/2 in (1,257 mm)
  - Coupled: 7 ft 9 in (2,362 mm)
- Length
  - Over couplers: 23 ft 1 in (7,036 mm)
- Height: 12 ft (3,658 mm)
- Frame type: Plate, 1 in (25 mm) thick
- Axle load: 6 LT 14 cwt (6,808 kg)
  - Leading: 6 LT 8 cwt (6,503 kg)
  - 1st coupled: 6 LT 12 cwt (6,706 kg)
  - 2nd coupled: 6 LT 14 cwt (6,808 kg)
  - 3rd coupled: 6 LT 4 cwt (6,299 kg)
- Adhesive weight: 19 LT 10 cwt (19,810 kg)
- Loco weight: 25 LT 18 cwt (26,320 kg)
- Fuel type: Coal
- Fuel capacity: 1 LT (1.0 t)
- Water cap.: 600 imp gal (2,700 L)
- Firebox
  - Type: Round-top
  - Grate area: 11.3 sq ft (1.05 m^{2})
- Boiler
  - Pitch: 5 ft 3 1/8 in (1,603 mm)
  - Diameter: 3 ft 4 in (1,016 mm)
  - Tube plates: 9 ft 6 in (2,896 mm)
  - Small tubes: 116: 1 3/4 in (44 mm)
- Boiler pressure: 130 psi (896 kPa)
- Safety valve: As built: Salter; Modified: Ramsbottom
- Heating surface
  - Firebox: 49.5 sq ft (4.60 m^{2})
  - Tubes: 590 sq ft (55 m^{2})
  - Total surface: 639.5 sq ft (59.41 m^{2})
- Cylinders: Two
- Cylinder size: 14 in (356 mm) bore 20 in (508 mm) stroke
- Valve gear: Stephenson
- Valve type: Slide
- Loco brake: Vacuum
- Couplers: Johnston link-and-pin
Performance figures
- Tractive effort: 9,800 lbf (44 kN) @ 75%
Career
- Operators: Natal Government Railways; South African Railways; East Rand Proprietary Mines
- Class: Class K
- Number in class: 7
- Numbers: NGR 1-7, later 501-507, SAR 0504 & 0507
- Delivered: 1877-1878
- First run: 1877
- Last run: 1931

The Natal Government Railways Class K 2-6-0T of 1877 was a South African steam locomotive from the pre-Union era in the Natal Colony.

The Natal Government Railways was established in terms of Act 4 of 1875. All the assets of the Natal Railway Company were taken over by the Colonial Government and became part of the new Railways with effect from 1 January 1877. On 1 June 1877, William Milne was appointed as the Railway's first Locomotive Superintendent. To cope with the anticipated traffic on the new Cape gauge line which was being built inland from Durban to Pietermaritzburg, Milne placed an order for seven new 2-6-0T locomotives. In 1905 or 1906, the survivors of these locomotives became part of the Natal Class K.

== Manufacturer ==
Natal Government Railways (NGR) Locomotive Superintendent William Milne, who first arrived in Natal on 14 March 1876 aboard the RMS Natal, was so impressed by the engines Durban & Pietermaritzburg, the two contractor's 2-6-0T locomotives which were being used on the construction of the line from Durban to Pietermaritzburg, that he placed an order with Beyer, Peacock & Company for seven of them. The locomotives were numbered in the range from 1 to 7 and were built in two batches, with numbers 1 to 5 being delivered in 1877 and the other two in 1878.

The first two locomotives, along with thirty open trucks and ten passenger carriages, were landed off the ship Empress of India on 14 December 1877. Engine no. 3 was the first to be placed in service, making its trial run on 10 January 1878.

== Characteristics ==
These were the first Cape gauge locomotives to enter service on the NGR. As built, the first five locomotives were identical in appearance to the two contractor's locomotives and were also wood-burners, equipped with balloon smokestacks with spark arresters. Tenders had been called on 1 March 1877, well in advance of their arrival, for the supply of "10 tons of blue gum and 10 tons of thornwood per month" as "firewood for the locomotives on the NGR".

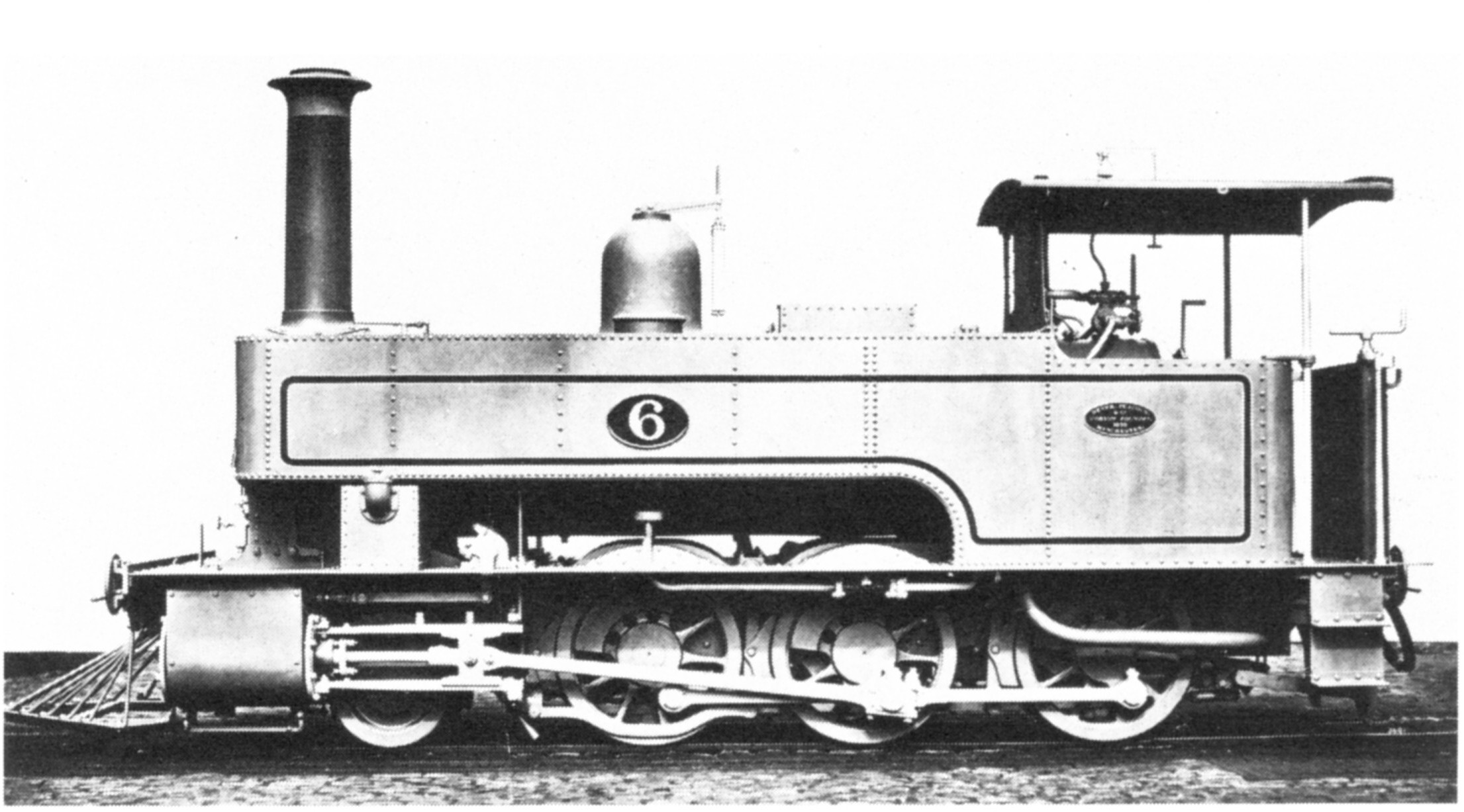
No. 6 with a brass-capped chimney

The leading wheels of these locomotives were smaller than those of the contractor's locomotives, at 25 3/4 inches (654 millimetres) diameter instead of 30 inches (762 millimetres). The last two engines were built as coal-burners and therefore had straight brass-capped chimneys instead of the balloon smokestacks. Another externally visible difference from the previous five was the top of the tank side-plate next to the cab, which had a cut-out along the top edge, compared to the straight top on the earlier models.

They had round-topped copper fireboxes, the crowns of which were supported by direct stays of Yorkshire iron which were screwed and riveted over at both ends. The fireboxes had brick arches, a feature which was only adopted in America and several other countries at much later dates.

As built, the locomotive had a single feedwater pump, fitted to the centre frame stretcher and driven by an eccentric on the centre of the driving axle. The buffing and drawgear were centrally arranged, with Johnston link-and-pin couplers without buffers instead of the buffers-and-chain which had been used on the three broad gauge Natal Railway Company locomotives.

== Modifications ==
Several modifications were made to the locomotives after they were placed in service. With the advent of Welsh coal, the balloon smokestacks of the first five engines were replaced by tall flared chimneys, with the spark arrester inside the smokebox. The flared chimneys were later brass-capped. On some, the smokebox was enlarged by extending it to within 3 inches (76 millimetres) of the buffer beam.

The massive headlamp and side lamps were added when night trains began running in 1879, while the sandbox was relocated from the running boards to the top of the boiler, ahead of the steam dome. At one stage, the vacuum brake ejector exhaust pipe was run along the top of the boiler on the right side and then up the rear side of the chimney, but it was altered again later to eject into the side of the smokebox. In addition, the axle-driven boiler feed-water pumps were replaced with injectors and the Salter safety valves were replaced with Ramsbottom safety valves. The modifications are illustrated in the following pictures.

== Service ==
=== Natal Government Railways ===
There was a brief period of 15 months when broad and Cape gauge rolling stock could be seen working in Durban side by side. Although the Resident Engineer of the new NGR had taken over the new Cape Gauge line between Point and Durban from the contractors in February 1878 and had used this track regularly for goods traffic since that date, the broad gauge between Point, Durban and Umgeni was only abandoned on Saturday 11 May of that year. The work in connection with regauging it to the new Cape gauge commenced immediately after the arrival of the last train on the Saturday evening and was completed late on Sunday night. The new line was ready for the first ordinary passenger train on the Monday morning when, for the first time, the new Cape gauge passenger rolling stock was placed on the railway for public service.

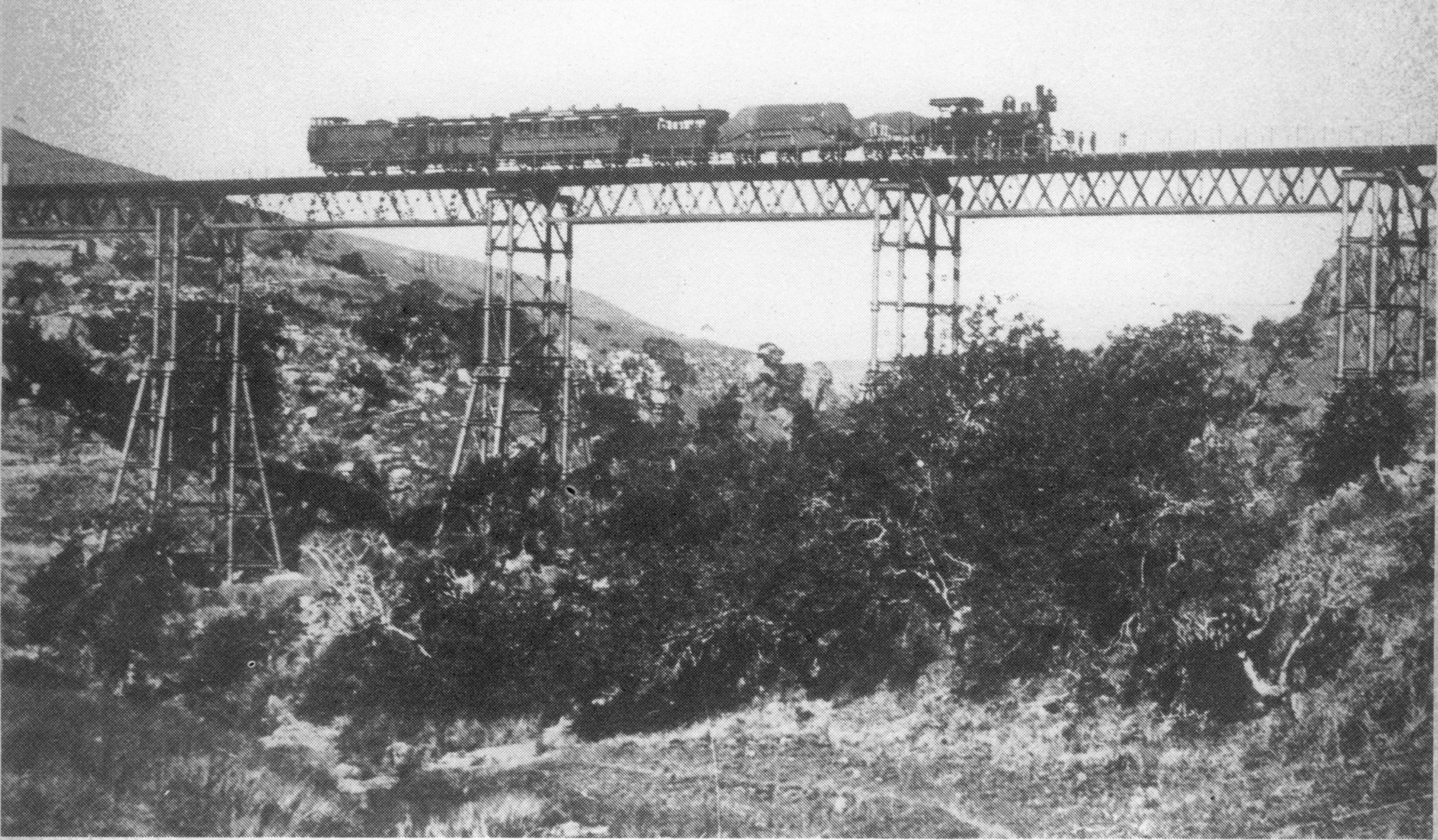
2-6-0T locomotive on the Inchanga viaduct, c. 1886

The new locomotives were placed in service on the new Natal mainline from Durban to Pietermaritzburg and worked it further and further inland, as construction progressed, to Pinetown by 4 September 1878, to Camperdown by 1 October 1880 and to Pietermaritzburg by 1 December 1880. The new South Coast line was opened to traffic to Isipingo on 15 June 1880 and work also progressed on the North Coast line, which was being extended from Umgeni to Verulam.

At some stage, possibly when they were taken off mainline service, the engines were renumbered into the range from 501 to 507. By December 1904, three of them, numbers 504, 506 and 507, were still in service.

At some stage in 1905 or 1906, a locomotive classification system was introduced on the NGR and the three survivors of these locomotives became part of the Natal Class K. The Class consisted of a potpourri of different tank locomotive types and also included two 0-4-0ST and one 0-6-0ST locomotives.

=== South African Railways ===
When the Union of South Africa was established on 31 May 1910, the three Colonial government railways (Cape Government Railways, NGR and Central South African Railways) were united under a single administration to control and administer the railways, ports and harbours of the Union. Although the South African Railways and Harbours came into existence in 1910, the actual classification and renumbering of all the rolling stock of the three constituent railways were only implemented with effect from 1 January 1912.

By 1912, two of these locomotives survived to be taken onto the South African Railways (SAR) roster. Since they were considered obsolete, they were not classified and appeared in the renumbering lists as "NGR 2-6-0T Beyer Peacock Sidetank" numbers 504 and 507, to be renumbered 0504 and 0507. Even so, they remained in service as late as 1930, at the end being employed as workshop shunting engines.

=== East Rand Proprietary Mines ===
One of the locomotives, no. 505, was sold to the East Rand Proprietary Mines on the Witwatersrand. The sale must have taken place between 1894, when the mine was registered, and 1905, since the locomotive does not appear in the NGR's 1904 year-end report. Photographic evidence also shows that it had not been modified in respect of the extended smokebox and sand dome. By the time this locomotive was involved in a bad accident which resulted in it having to be scrapped c. 1970, it had been in service for more than ninety years.

== Works numbers ==
The works numbers, renumbering and disposition of the NGR Class K of 1877 are listed in the table.

NGR Class K 2-6-0T
No.	Works no.	Year in service	New no.	SAR no.
1	1702	1877	501	
2	1703	1877	502	
3	1704	1877	503	
4	1705	1877	504	0504
5	1706	1877	505	ERPM
6	1817	1878	506	
7	1818	1878	507	0507
