= NGR Class K 0-4-0ST =

1891 South African steam locomotive

NGR Class K 0-4-0ST PPR 0-4-0ST Natal South African 0-4-0ST 1891
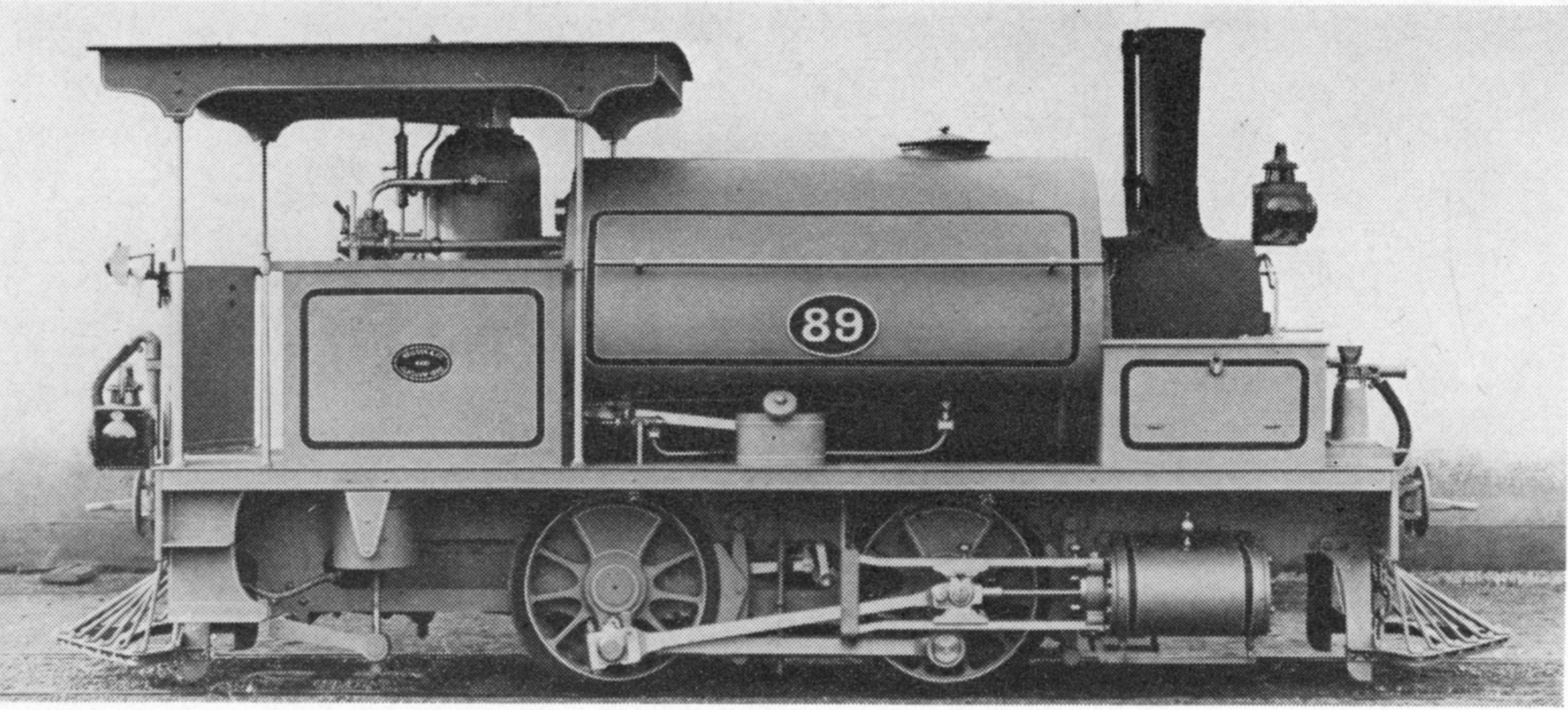
- NGR no. 89, c. 1891
Type and origin
- Power type: Steam
- Designer: Neilson and Company
- Builder: Neilson and Company
- Serial number: 4481–4485
- Build date: 1891
- Total produced: 5
Specifications
- Configuration
  - Whyte: 0-4-0ST
  - UIC: Bn2t
- Driver: 2nd coupled axle
- Gauge: 3 ft 6 in (1,067 mm) Cape gauge
- Coupled dia.: 38 in (965 mm)
- Wheelbase: 5 ft (1,524 mm)
- Length
  - Over couplers: 20 ft 4 in (6,198 mm)
- Height: 10 ft (3,048 mm)
- Adhesive weight: 18 LT 17 cwt (19,150 kg)
- Loco weight: 18 LT 17 cwt (19,150 kg)
- Fuel type: Coal
- Fuel capacity: 15 long hundredweight (0.76 t)
- Water cap.: 500 imp gal (2,270 L)
- Firebox
  - Type: Round-top
  - Grate area: 5.75 sq ft (0.534 m^{2})
- Boiler
  - Pitch: 5 ft (1,524 mm)
  - Diameter: 2 ft 10 in (864 mm) outside
  - Tube plates: 8 ft 3 1/4 in (2,521 mm)
  - Small tubes: 110: 1 1/2 in (38 mm)
- Boiler pressure: 140 psi (965 kPa)
- Safety valve: Salter
- Heating surface
  - Firebox: 32.25 sq ft (2.996 m^{2})
  - Tubes: 357.25 sq ft (33.190 m^{2})
  - Total surface: 389.5 sq ft (36.19 m^{2})
- Cylinders: Two
- Cylinder size: 10 in (254 mm) bore 20 in (508 mm) stroke
- Valve gear: Stephenson
- Valve type: Slide
- Loco brake: Vacuum
- Train brakes: Vacuum
- Couplers: Johnston link-and-pin
Performance figures
- Tractive effort: 5,526 lbf (24.58 kN) @ 75%
Career
- Operators: Natal Government Railways; Harbour Board of Natal; Pretoria-Pietersburg Railway; Imperial Military Railways; Central South African Railways; South African Railways
- Number in class: 5
- Numbers: NGR 89-93, NGR 510-511, SAR 0511
- Delivered: 1891
- First run: 1891

The Natal Government Railways Class K 0-4-0ST of 1891 was a South African steam locomotive from the pre-Union era in the Colony of Natal.

In 1891, the Natal Government Railways placed five 0-4-0ST locomotives in service as shunting engines. One was later sold to the Pretoria-Pietersburg Railway, while two more went to the Harbour Board of Natal. In 1905 or 1906, the remaining two of these locomotives became part of the Natal Class K. By 1912, four of these locomotives survived to come onto the roster of the South African Railways as unclassified obsolete locomotives.

== Manufacturer ==
Five 0-4-0ST shunting locomotives were delivered to the Natal Government Railways (NGR) from Neilson and Company in 1891, numbered in the range from 89 to 93.

== Characteristics ==
The locomotive's cylinders were arranged outside the frame, while the slide valves were arranged between the frames and actuated by Stephenson valve gear link motion through rocker shafts. The boiler dome was arranged above the firebox, with two Salter safety valves which were adjusted to blow off at 140 pounds per square inch (965 kilopascals). The locomotive was equipped with a No. 40 combination ejector and two vacuum brake cylinders, each 15 inches (381 millimetres) in diameter.

== Service ==
=== Harbour Board of Natal ===
In c. 1896, two of the locomotives were either sold or leased to the Harbour Board of Natal for use as harbour shunters at Durban Harbour, where they were named Andy and Dick King.

=== Pretoria-Pietersburg Railway ===
In c. 1897, another one of the locomotives, no. 90, was sold to the Pretoria-Pietersburg Railway (PPR), where it was named Natal and employed as a shunting engine. By 1912, when the South African Railways (SAR) classification and renumbering program was executed, this locomotive had also seen service with the Nederlandsche-Zuid-Afrikaansche Spoorweg-Maatschappij (NZASM) and the Imperial Military Railways (IMR) and was still in service on the Central South African Railways (CSAR), who used it as a shop engine in the Pretoria railway workshops.

=== Natal Government Railways ===
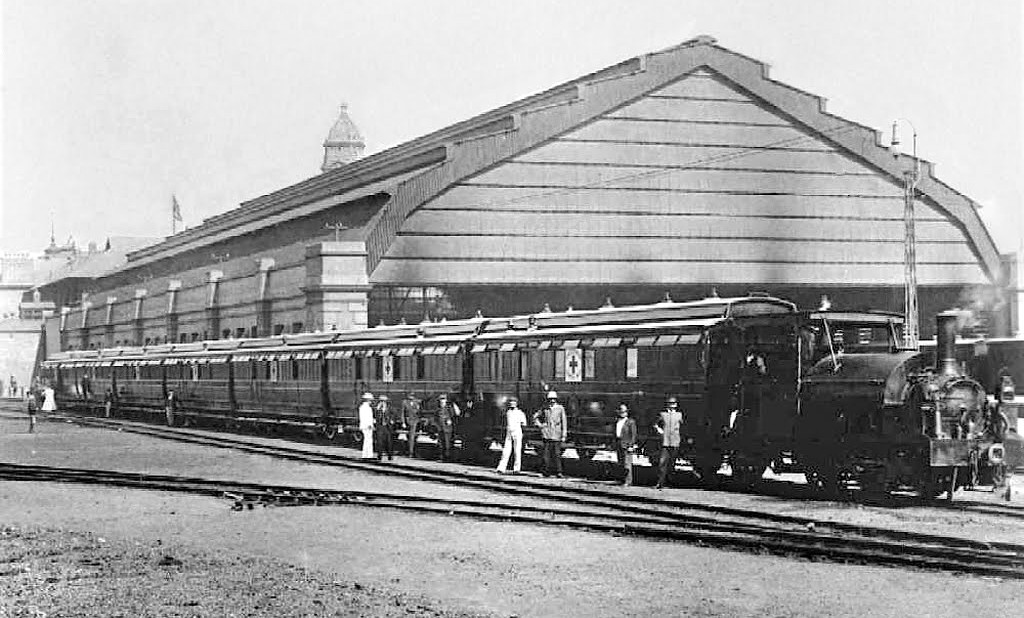
On the Princess Christian Hospital Train at Durban, c. 1900

The other two locomotives remained in service on the NGR, where they were later renumbered to 510 and 511. By the turn of the 20th Century they were used on light duties like the testing of the vacuum brakes of passenger trains at Durban Station, such as the depicted Princess Christian Hospital Train which was used to attend wounded soldiers during the Second Boer War.

At some stage in 1905 or 1906, a locomotive classification system was introduced on the NGR and they became part of the Natal Class K, which consisted of a potpourri of different tank locomotive types, including an 0-6-0ST and four 2-6-0T engines. Both locomotives were still in service in 1905, but by the end of 1906, no. 510 had disappeared from the books.

=== South African Railways ===
When the Union of South Africa was established on 31 May 1910, the three Colonial government railways (Cape Government Railways, NGR and CSAR) were united under a single administration to control and administer the railways, ports and harbours of the Union. Although the South African Railways and Harbours came into existence in 1910, the actual classification and renumbering of all the rolling stock of the three constituent railways was only implemented with effect from 1 January 1912.

In 1912, Andy, Dick King, no. 511 and the Pretoria shop locomotive Natal came onto the roster of the SAR as unclassified obsolete locomotives. The named engines retained their names on the SAR, while no. 511 was renumbered 0511.

== Works numbers ==
The locomotive numbers, works numbers, names and SAR renumber information are listed in the table. The three unspecified names can all be any one of Andy, Dick King or no. 510.

NGR Class K 0-4-0ST
Loco no.	Works no.	Names & renumber	SAR no.
89	4481	510, Andy or Dick King	510, Andy or Dick King
90	4482	Natal	Natal
91	4483	511	0511
92	4484	510, Andy or Dick King	510, Andy or Dick King
93	4485	510, Andy or Dick King	510, Andy or Dick King
