= GE U26C =

Locomotive class

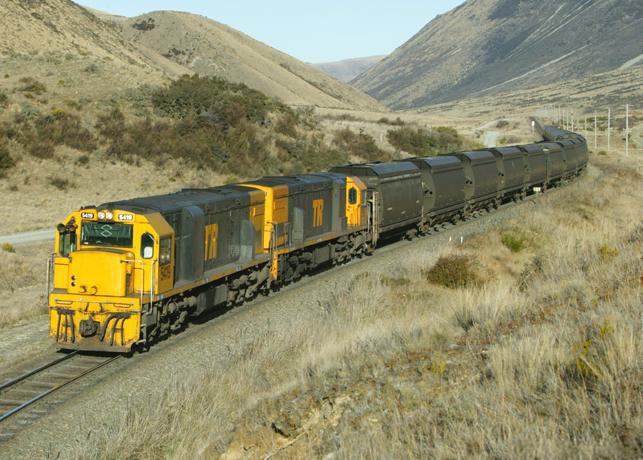
- Two DX class U26Cs in New Zealand with a coal train
Type and origin
- Power type: Diesel–electric
- Builder: GE Transportation Systems; Krupp (TAZARA U30Cs)
- Serial number: Brazil: 2501013-018; Kenya: 41812-41837, 45374-45383; New Zealand: 38016-38030, 40175-40208; South Africa: 35261-35282, 37810-37934, 38623-38722, 40400-40419, 40570-40571, 40578, 40579, 41350-41379; TAZARA: 5532-5540, 5561-5565, 46514-46530
- Model: U26C
- Build date: 1971–1987
- Total produced: 392
Specifications
- Configuration
  - AAR: C-C
  - UIC: Co'Co'
- Gauge: 1,000 mm (3 ft 3 3/8 in), Brazil and Kenya; 1,600 mm (5 ft 3 in), Brazil; 1,067 mm (3 ft 6 in) elsewhere
- Wheelbase: 3,607 mm (142.01 in) each bogie
- Length: 17.5 to 17.9 m (57 ft 5.0 in to 58 ft 8.7 in)
- Axle load: 15.1–16.25 t (14.86–15.99 long tons; 16.64–17.91 short tons)
- Loco weight: 91–97.5 t (89.6–96.0 long tons; 100.3–107.5 short tons)
- Fuel type: Diesel
- Fuel capacity: 7,500 L (1,600 imp gal; 2,000 US gal)
- Prime mover: GE 7FDL-12
- RPM range: 1050 max
- Engine type: 4 stroke diesel engine
- Aspiration: Turbocharged
- Alternator: GTA11 C.C.
- Traction motors: 6 × 761A17
- Cylinders: V12
- Cylinder size: 9 in × 10 1/2 in (228.6 mm × 266.7 mm)
- MU working: Yes
- Loco brake: Compressed air
Performance figures
- Power output: 2,050 kW (2,750 hp)
- Tractive effort: 24,630 kgf (241,500 N; 54,300 lbf)
Career
- Numbers: 100–120 km/h (62–75 mph)(?)

The GE U26C diesel locomotive model was introduced by GE Transportation Systems in 1971 as a narrow-gauge version of the GE U23C model. All examples of this model are six axle units, and have the wheel arrangement C-C (AAR classification) or Co'Co' (UIC classification).

The U26C locomotives were built for 1,000 mm (3 ft 3 3/8 in) metre gauge networks in Brazil and Kenya, and 3 ft 6 in (1,067 mm) networks in New Zealand and South Africa. All had a power output of 2,050 kW (2,750 hp) as built, except the locomotives delivered new to Kenya, which were derated to 1,950 kW (2,610 hp). Some of the New Zealand units were later uprated in power output, and four of the Brazilian units were later regauged to 1,600 mm (5 ft 3 in) broad gauge.

Another more powerful version, license-built by Krupp, and referred to as a GE U30C model, was delivered to the 3 ft 6 in (1,067 mm) TAZARA Railway, which links Tanzania with Zambia. This is unrelated to the GE U30C built for North America.

== Technical details ==
The U26Cs have the typical hood unit configuration of North American diesel locomotives, and a road switcher design.

The turbocharged V12 four-stroke diesel engine, generator and auxiliary equipment are easily accessible under a long hood equally as high as, but narrower than, the single cab, which is mounted at one end. This arrangement allows the driver to see in both directions. However, in line service the leading locomotive is usually operated with the cab end ahead.

The six electric traction motors are mounted in the two bogies; each drives one axle. Between the bogies is the fuel tank. The U26Cs are capable of multiple-unit train control operation. In New Zealand and South Africa, trains operated by four or more locomotives are not uncommon.

Other technical data of the locomotives varies depending on the build year and construction, but the type of motor fitted is always the GE 7FDL-12.

== Countries in service ==
=== Brazil ===
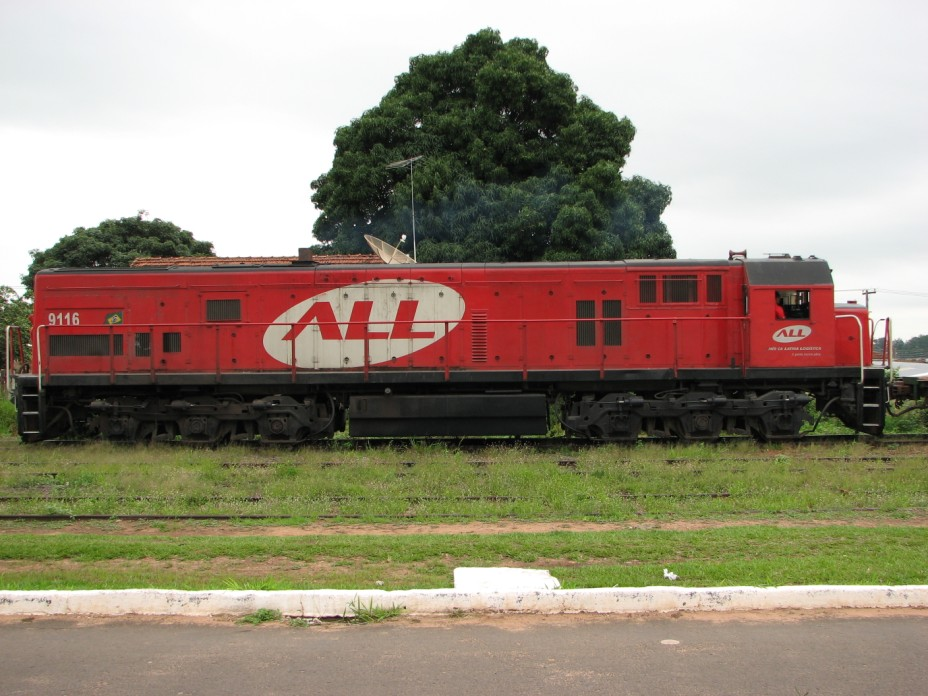
No. 9116 of the Brazilian ALL

Six U26Cs, built for metre gauge use, were delivered in 1981 to the Brazilian Estrada de Ferro Vitória a Minas (EFVM), where they were given road numbers 401-406. They were constructed by GE Brasil.

Four of these locomotives (Nos. 401, 402, 404 and 406) were taken over in 1998 by Ferronorte and regauged to broad gauge (1,600 mm (5 ft 3 in)).

Since 2006 these locomotives have been owned by América Latina Logística (ALL).

=== Kenya ===
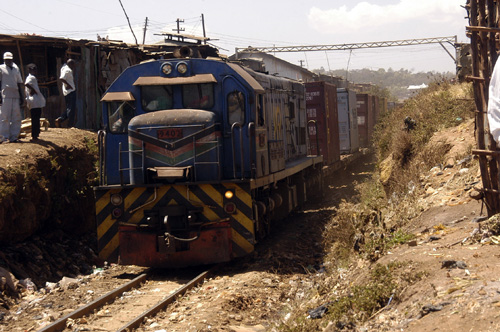
Kenyan 9402 with a goods train

The Kenya Railways (KR) U26C locomotives have been designated as class 93 (delivery in 1977, 26 units) and 94 (delivery in 1987, 10 units).

In 1998, five of the class 93 locomotives were leased to Magadi Rail, a subsidiary of the Magadi Soda Company. They were used to operate soda ash trains from Magadi along the 150 km (93 mi) branch line to Konza, which is also leased to Magadi Rail. In 2007, they were returned to their owner.

As at 2011, all members of class 93 and 94 formed part of the fleet of the Rift Valley Railways, which currently manages the parastatal railways of Kenya and Uganda. They were all still serviceable and suitable for rehabilitation and upgrading.

Another group of U26Cs, known as class 95, consisted of eleven South African Class 34-400 units, converted to metre gauge. They were leased from Spoornet for a number of years until April 2002, when they were returned to South Africa.

=== New Zealand ===
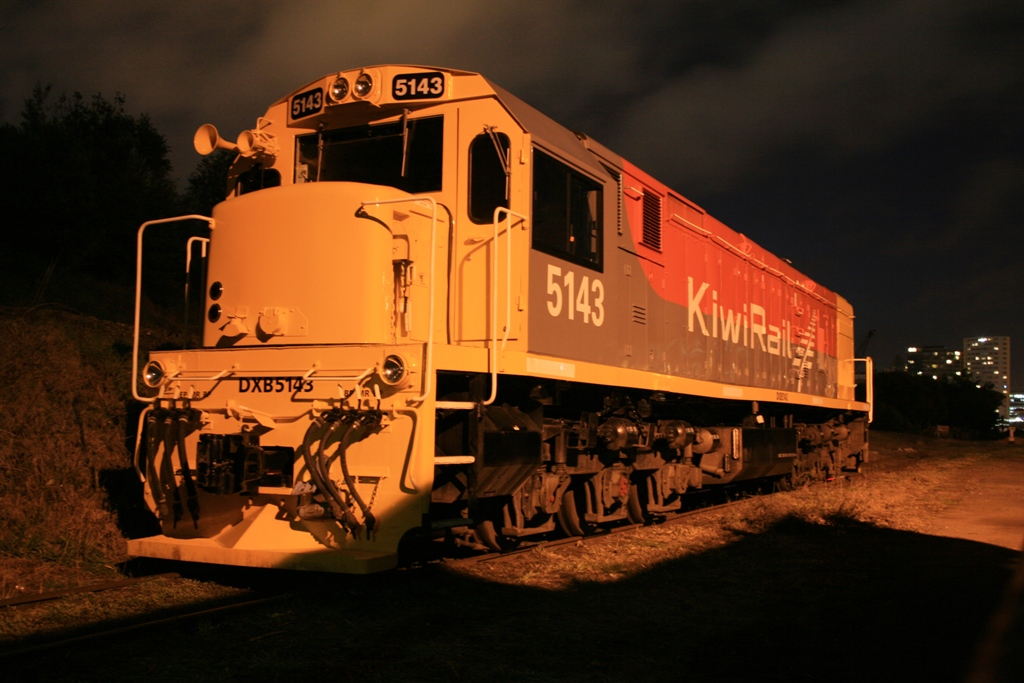
DXB 5143 at Mainline Steam Parnell, Auckland

A total of 49 units of the U26C model were built for the New Zealand Railways Department as the DX class, 15 of them in 1971, and a further 34 in 1975 – 76. The initial road numbers of these locomotives were 2600–2648.

Over time, all locomotives in the DX class received minor modifications. These included the fitting of modified cabs with one piece windshields. Other changes involved the electronics and the couplings.

Some DXs have been further modified, to operate through the over 8.5 km (5.3 mi) long and steeply graded Otira Tunnel on the South Island. The air intakes of these locomotives were remounted outside the locomotive body, and fitted with a downward heading intake scoop, to prevent them from drawing in exhaust gases accumulating at the tunnel's ceiling. The image at the top right of this article is of locomotives belonging to this variant, known as the DXC sub class.

One member of the DX class was much more substantially rebuilt in 1993, and another in 2006. The rebuilt locomotives were redesignated as the DXR class (with the R signifying rebuilt). Amongst other things, they were fitted with a new engine, and an enlarged, modernised cab. However, the rebuilding program was not pursued any further.

A single DX was retired in the 1970s following an accident; as at 2010, the remaining 48, including the two DXRs, were still in operation. All of them are now renumbered, and reclassified as DXB, DXC, or DXR.

All DX variants have had modern BrightStar™ Control Systems retrofitted. The BrightStar™ Control System has also been fitted to DFB class locomotives with excellent results. Trials of BrightStar™ on other GMD models have proved unsatisfactory.

=== South Africa ===
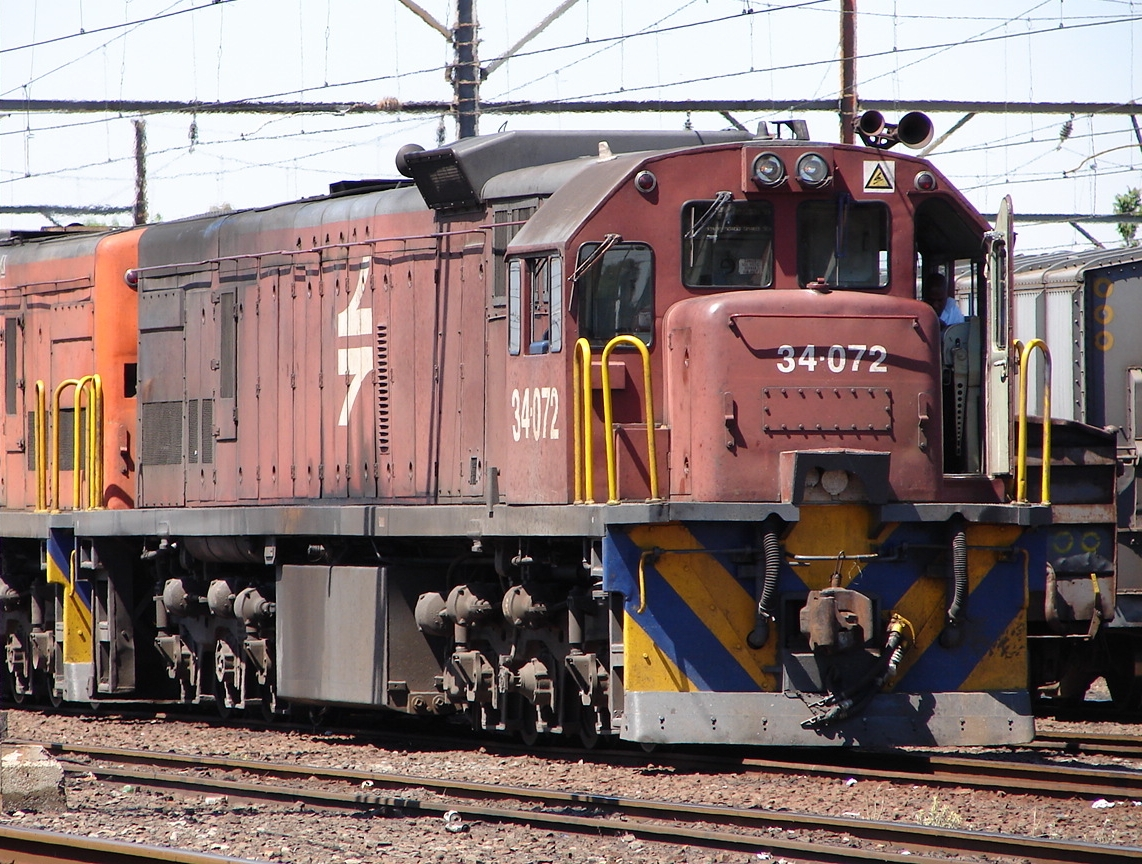
SAR No. 34-072 at Bloemfontein, Free State, 2009

The most numerous U26Cs were the 255 units built for the South African Railways (SAR), later renamed Spoornet and then Transnet Freight Rail (TFR), for which they were designated as part of class 34. The various production runs of the SAR locomotives were grouped into subclasses 34-000 (125 units, 1971–73), 34-400 (100 units, 1973) and 34-900 (30 units, 1979–80). As such, their subclassifications were mixed in with EMD GT26MC model locomotives, which are of similar weight and performance, and were subclassified as 34-200, 34-600, 34-800 and 37-000. The SAR U26C locomotives have been used to haul both goods and passenger trains, including the Blue Train.

Another 44 units of the U26C model were delivered in 1971–73 to the ISCOR works (now Mittal Steel South Africa) as industrial locomotives. Thirty nine of these locomotives were later taken over by Spoornet, and incorporated into SAR class 34 as road numbers 34-501 to 34-539 (class 34-500 or "34-400 ex ISCOR"). Two additional U26Cs went to the Douglas Colliery in 1977. Except for the latter two locomotives, and the first three SAR units, all of the South African U26Cs were built under license at Dorbyl Transport Products.

One unusual operation regularly performed by South African U26Cs is the haulage of Orex trains on the Sishen-Saldanha Bay iron ore line. On this line, which has been electrified at 50kV since 1978, U26C locomotives, and especially the former ISCOR machines, daily work in multiple unit operation with electric locomotives of the much more powerful and heavier class 9E or class 15E, but should be replaced in late 2011 by new Class 43-000 diesel–electric locomotives. In some cases, trains on this line have also been hauled exclusively by diesel locomotives, as was the case before electrification.

In December 2025, South African rail operator Traxtion announced it had purchased from KiwiRail all operable condition New Zealand DX class locomotives (which are GE U26C models with various upgrades). The 46 locomotives will be shipped in four tranches between April 2026 and August 2027.

=== Tanzania / Zambia ===
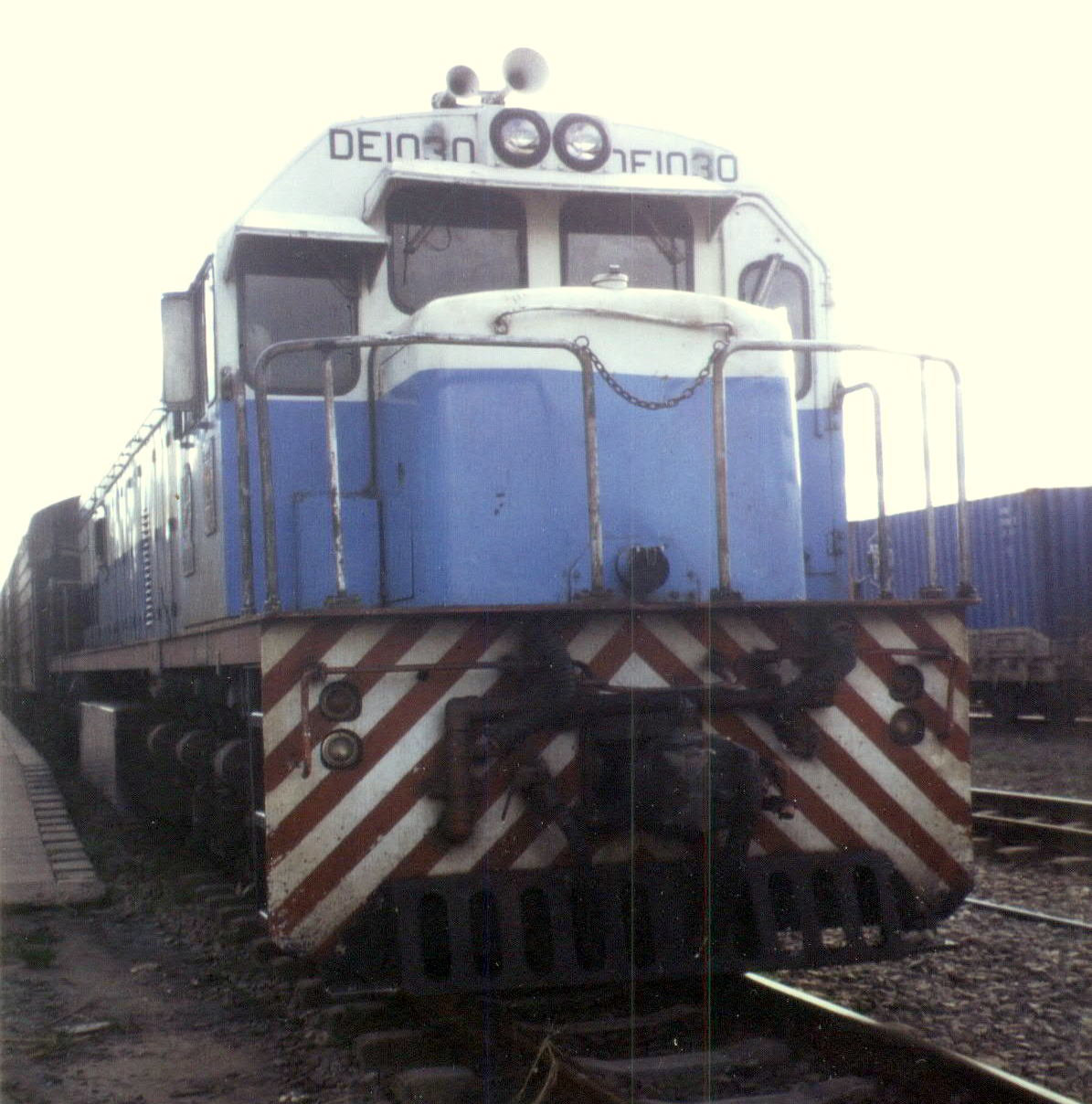
TAZARA Railway U30C

In 1982, Krupp supplied 22 3 ft 6 in (1,067 mm) to the TAZARA. These units correspond with the U26C, but their power output was increased to about 2,200 kW (3,000 hp). They are therefore referred to as U30C models, although this designation had been assigned initially to a series of standard gauge locomotives built for US railroads between 1966 and 1976 (see GE U30C).

The Tazara U30Cs were acquired to supplement the ageing and underpowered Chinese made locomotives that had been used on the Tazara Railway since its opening in 1976.
