= South African Class 34-000 =

Class of 125 South African diesel-electric locomotives

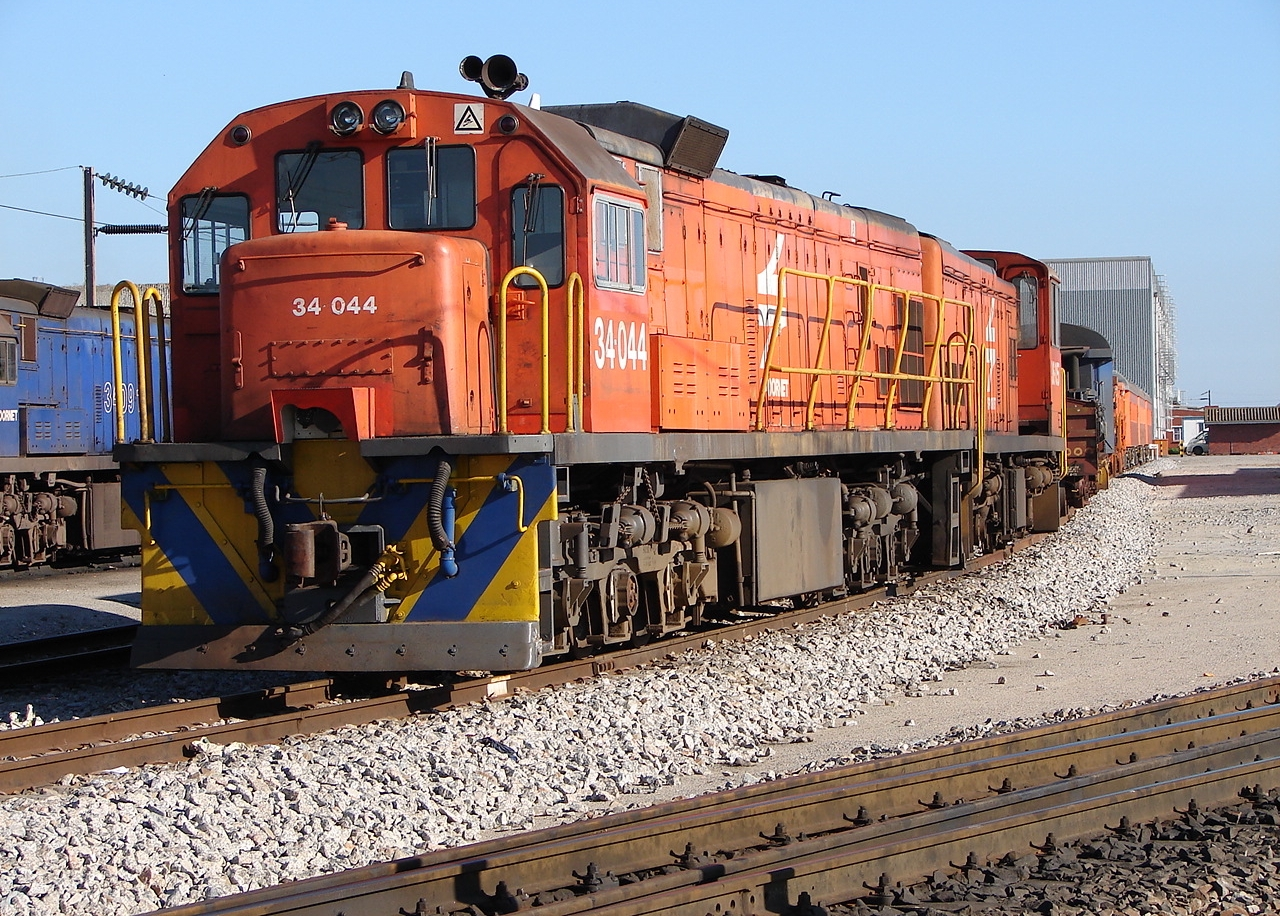
- No. 34-044 at Saldanha, Western Cape, 26 July 2009
Type and origin
- Power type: Diesel-electric
- Designer: General Electric
- Builder: General Electric; SA GE-DL Locomotive Group
- Serial number: 37810-37934
- Model: GE U26C
- Build date: 1971-1973
- Total produced: 125
Specifications
- Configuration
  - AAR: C-C
  - UIC: Co'Co'
  - Commonwealth: Co+Co
- Gauge: 3 ft 6 in (1,067 mm) Cape gauge
- Wheel diameter: 915 mm (36.0 in)
- Wheelbase: 13,004 mm (42 ft 8.0 in)
  - Bogie: 3,188 mm (10 ft 5.5 in)
- Pivot centres: 10,058 mm (33 ft 0 in)
- Length
  - Over couplers: 17,982 mm (59 ft 0 in)
- Width: 2,756 mm (9 ft 0.5 in)
- Height: 3,962 mm (13 ft 0 in)
- Axle load: 18,850 kg (41,560 lb)
- Adhesive weight: 113,100 kg (249,300 lb)
- Loco weight: 113,100 kg (249,300 lb) max
- Fuel type: Diesel
- Fuel capacity: 5,400 litres (1,200 imp gal) as built 7,000 litres (1,500 imp gal) mod.
- Prime mover: GE 7FDL-12
- RPM range: 450-1,050
  - RPM low idle: 450
  - RPM idle: 535
  - Maximum RPM: 1,050
- Engine type: 4 stroke diesel
- Aspiration: Elliott H-581 turbocharger
- Alternator: 10 pole 3 phase GE 5GT-A11C1
- Traction motors: Six GE 5GE-761A13 DC 4 pole
  - Rating 1 hour: 665A
  - Continuous: 655A @ 24 km/h (15 mph)
- Cylinders: V12
- Gear ratio: 92:19
- MU working: 6 maximum
- Loco brake: 28-LAV-1 with vigilance control
- Train brakes: Westinghouse 6CDX4UC compressor/exhauster
- Air tank cap.: 825 litres (181 imp gal)
- Compressor: 0.039 m^{3}/s (1.4 cu ft/s)
- Exhauster: 0.155 m^{3}/s (5.5 cu ft/s)
- Couplers: AAR knuckle type E
Performance figures
- Maximum speed: 100 km/h (62 mph)
- Power output
  - Starting: 2,050 kW (2,750 hp)
  - Continuous: 1,940 kW (2,600 hp)
- Tractive effort
  - Starting: 272 kN (61,000 lbf) @ 25% adh.
  - Continuous: 218 kN (49,000 lbf) @ 26 km/h (16 mph)
- Factor of adh.
  - Starting: 25%
  - Continuous: 20%
- Brakeforce: 60% ratio @ 345 kPa (50.0 psi)
- Dynamic brake peak effort: 180 kN (40,000 lbf) @ 29 km/h (18 mph)
Career
- Operators: South African Railways; Spoornet; Transnet Freight Rail; PRASA
- Class: Class 34-000
- Number in class: 125
- Numbers: 34-001 to 34-125
- Delivered: 1971-1973
- First run: 1971

The South African Railways Class 34-000 of 1971 is a diesel-electric locomotive.

Between July 1971 and March 1973, the South African Railways placed 125 Class 34-000 General Electric type U26C diesel-electric locomotives in service.

== Manufacturer ==
The Class 34-000 type GE U26C diesel-electric locomotive of the South African Railways (SAR) was designed by General Electric (GE). The first three locomotives were built by GE and imported, numbered in the range from 34-001 to 34-003, while the remainder were built by the South African General Electric-Dorman Long Locomotive Group (SA GE-DL, later Dorbyl) and numbered in the range from 34-004 to 34-125. The 125 locomotives entered service between July 1971 and March 1973.

The same U26C locomotive type is also in use on other railways around the world. One of them is the New Zealand Railways, where it is known as their DX class. Other users are Kenya Railways who for some years also leased South African Class 34 U26C locomotives, and América Latina Logística (ALL) in Brazil.

== Class 34 series ==
=== GE and GM-EMD designs ===
The Class 34 consists of seven series, the GE Classes 34-000, 34-400, 34-500 (also known as "34-400 ex Iscor") and 34-900, and the General Motors Electro-Motive Division (GM-EMD) Classes 34-200, 34-600 and 34-800. Both manufacturers also produced locomotives for the South African Classes 33, 35 and 36.

=== Distinguishing features ===
As built, the GE Classes 34-000, 34-400 and 34-900 locomotives were visually indistinguishable from each other. The Class 34-500 locomotives could be visually distinguished from the other series by the air conditioning units mounted on their cab roofs and initially when it was still a feature unique to them, by their running board mounted handrails. At some stage during the mid-1980s, all Class 34-000, 34-400 and 34-500 locomotives had saddle filters installed across the long hood, mounted just to the rear of the screens behind the cab on the sides. Since then, Class 34-900 locomotives could be distinguished from the older models by the absence of the saddle filter.

== Modifications ==
=== Fuel capacity ===
As built, the Class 34-000 has a 5,400 litres (1,200 imperial gallons) fuel tank and interlinked bogies, while the Class 34-500 was delivered new to Iscor with a 7,000 litres (1,500 imperial gallons) fuel tank to cope with the lack of en route refuelling points on the Sishen-Saldanha iron ore line. To facilitate the larger fuel tank, the inter-bogie linkage found on all other models had to be omitted on the Class 34-500.

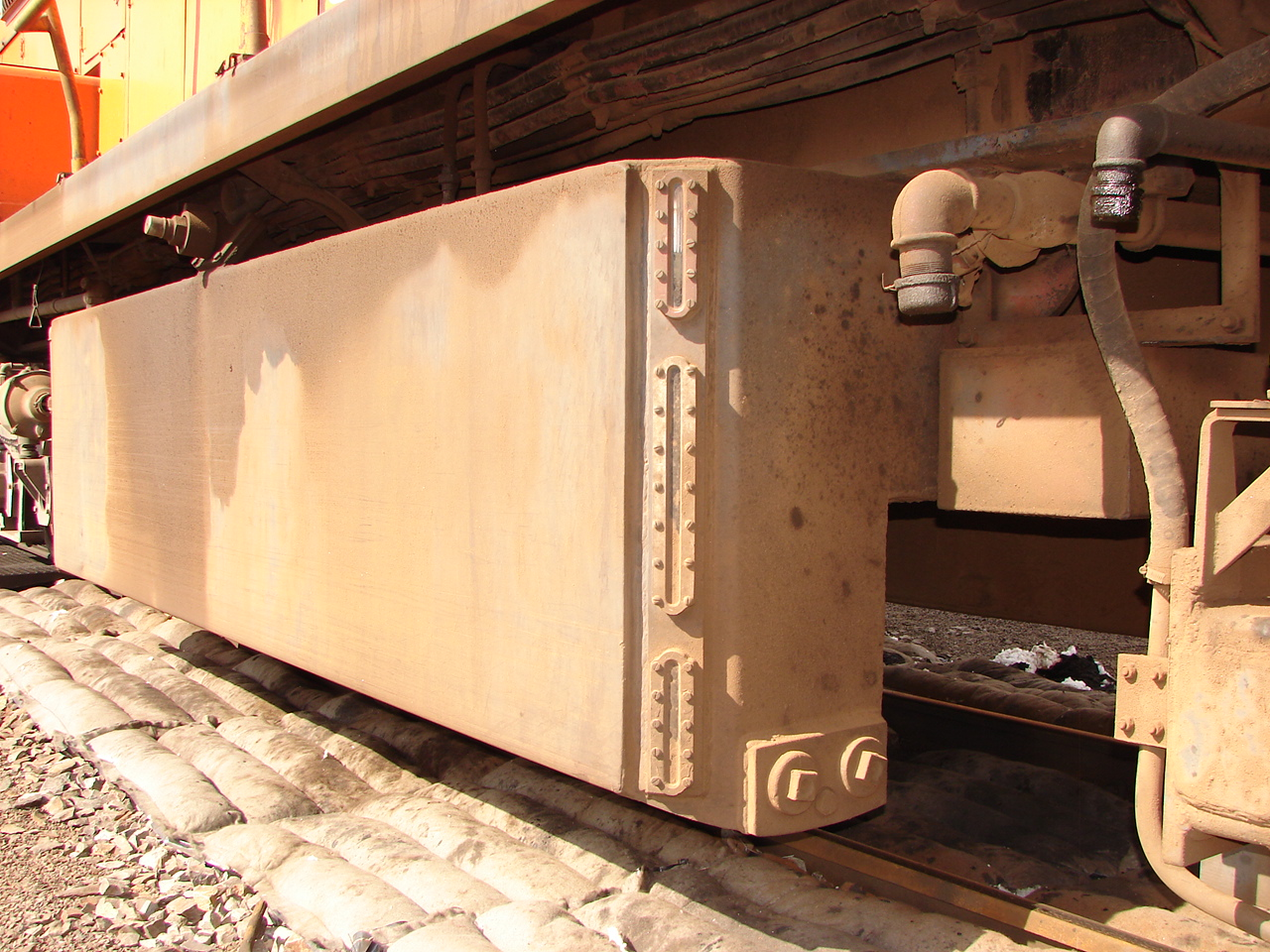
Standard 5,400 litre fuel tank

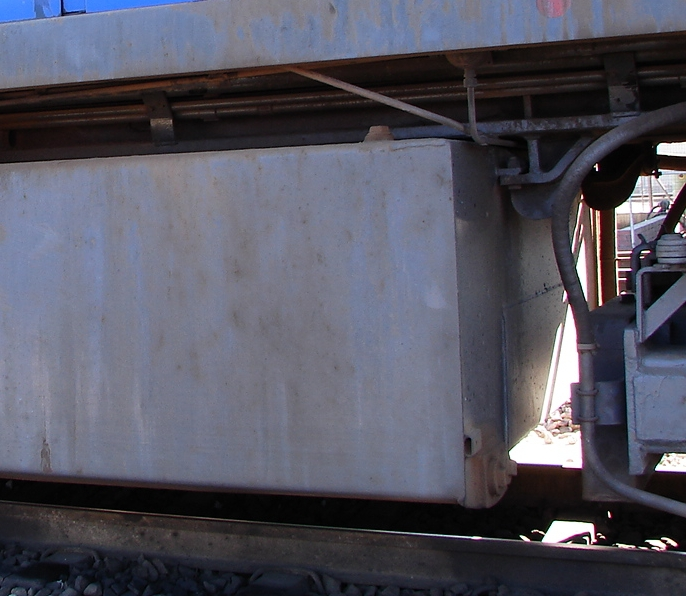
Enlarged 7,000 litre fuel tank

To be usable on the iron ore line, Class 34-000 locomotives which ended up working there were modified to a similar fuel capacity. The inter-bogie linkage was removed and the fuel tank was enlarged by changing it from saddle-shaped to rectangular box-shaped. To maintain its lateral balance, a slab of metal was attached to each bogie in place of the removed linkage. In the second picture, the weld lines on the end of the enlarged fuel tank as well as the metal slab at the end of the bogie are visible.

=== Running board mounted handrails ===
Class 34-000 locomotives that were allocated to the Sishen-Saldanha Orex line were often modified by having removable running board-mounted handrails installed. All pre-2000 South African diesel-electric locomotives had their side handrails mounted along the upper edges of their long hoods. The ex Iscor Class 34-500s, however, came equipped with additional removable running board-mounted handrails. Since these handrails are slide-fit into brackets which are welded onto the running board, they are easily removed.

Since c. 2009, other mainline diesel-electric locomotive types also emerged from the Koedoespoort Transwerk shops with running board mounted handrails after major overhauls.

=== Electronic control system ===
Beginning in 2010, some Class 34-000 locomotives were equipped with electronic fuel injection and GE "Bright Star" control systems. On some of the first locomotives which were so modified, evidence of the modification is a raised middle portion of the long hood.

== Service ==
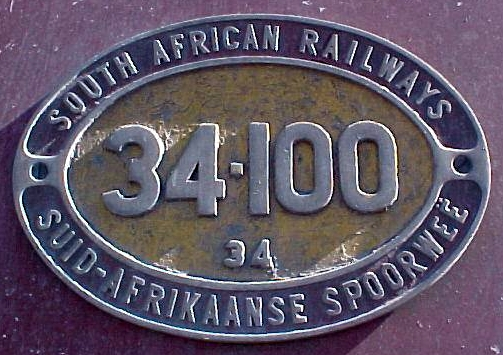

GE Class 34-000s work on most mainlines and some branch lines in the central, western, southern and southeastern parts of the country. Some eventually joined the Class 34-500 on the 861-kilometre-long (535-mile) Sishen–Saldanha Orex line to haul export ore from the open cast iron mines at Sishen near Kathu in the Northern Cape to the harbour at Saldanha in the Western Cape, until they gradually began to be replaced by new Class 43-000 locomotives in 2012.

On the Orex line, GE Class 34 series diesel-electric locomotives ran consisted to Class 9E or Class 15E electric locomotives to haul the 342-wagon iron ore trains. Each wagon has a 100-ton capacity and the trains are at least 3.72 kilometres (2.31 miles) in length, powered by mixed consists of Class 9E and Class 15E electric, GE U26C Class 34-000, 34-400, 34-500 and 34-900 and from 2012, GE C30ACi Class 43-000 diesel-electric locomotives. In South Africa, mixed electric and diesel-electric consists are unique to the iron ore line.

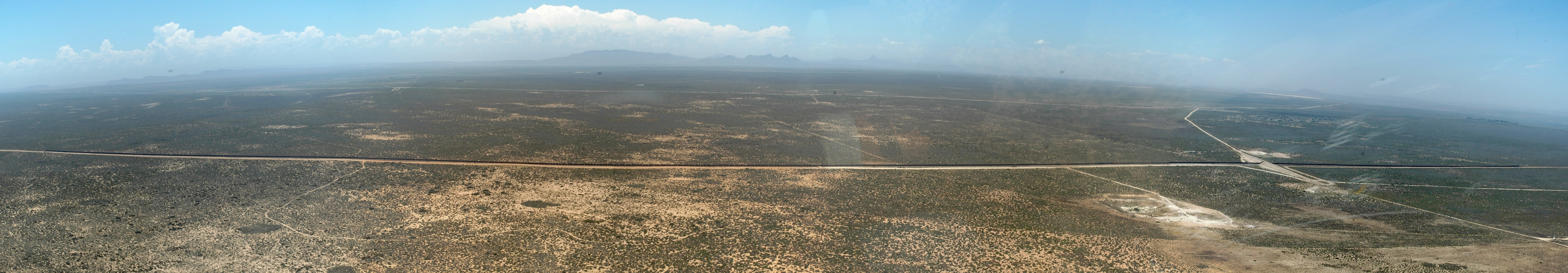
Ore train about 100 kilometres (62 miles) north of Lamberts Bay

== Works numbers ==
The Class 34-000 builder's works numbers are listed in the table.

Class 34-000, GE type U26C
Loco no.	Builder	Works no.
34-001	GE	37810
34-002	GE	37811
34-003	GE	37812
34-004	GE-DL	37813
34-005	GE-DL	37814
34-006	GE-DL	37815
34-007	GE-DL	37816
34-008	GE-DL	37817
34-009	GE-DL	37818
34-010	GE-DL	37819
34-011	GE-DL	37820
34-012	GE-DL	37821
34-013	GE-DL	37822
34-014	GE-DL	37823
34-015	GE-DL	37824
34-016	GE-DL	37825
34-017	GE-DL	37826
34-018	GE-DL	37827
34-019	GE-DL	37828
34-020	GE-DL	37829
34-021	GE-DL	37830
34-022	GE-DL	37831
34-023	GE-DL	37832
34-024	GE-DL	37833
34-025	GE-DL	37834
34-026	GE-DL	37835
34-027	GE-DL	37836
34-028	GE-DL	37837
34-029	GE-DL	37838
34-030	GE-DL	37839
34-031	GE-DL	37840
34-032	GE-DL	37841
34-033	GE-DL	37842
34-034	GE-DL	37843
34-035	GE-DL	37844
34-036	GE-DL	37845
34-037	GE-DL	37846
34-038	GE-DL	37847
34-039	GE-DL	37848
34-040	GE-DL	37849
34-041	GE-DL	37850
34-042	GE-DL	37851
34-043	GE-DL	37852
34-044	GE-DL	37853
34-045	GE-DL	37854
34-046	GE-DL	37855
34-047	GE-DL	37856
34-048	GE-DL	37857
34-049	GE-DL	37858
34-050	GE-DL	37859
34-051	GE-DL	37860
34-052	GE-DL	37861
34-053	GE-DL	37862
34-054	GE-DL	37863
34-055	GE-DL	37864
34-056	GE-DL	37865
34-057	GE-DL	37866
34-058	GE-DL	37867
34-059	GE-DL	37868
34-060	GE-DL	37869
34-061	GE-DL	37870
34-062	GE-DL	37871
34-063	GE-DL	37872
34-064	GE-DL	37873
34-065	GE-DL	37874
34-066	GE-DL	37875
34-067	GE-DL	37876
34-068	GE-DL	37877
34-069	GE-DL	37878
34-070	GE-DL	37879
34-071	GE-DL	37880
34-072	GE-DL	37881
34-073	GE-DL	37882
34-074	GE-DL	37883
34-075	GE-DL	37884
34-076	GE-DL	37885
34-077	GE-DL	37886
34-078	GE-DL	37887
34-079	GE-DL	37888
34-080	GE-DL	37889
34-081	GE-DL	37890
34-082	GE-DL	37891
34-083	GE-DL	37892
34-084	GE-DL	37893
34-085	GE-DL	37894
34-086	GE-DL	37895
34-087	GE-DL	37896
34-088	GE-DL	37897
34-089	GE-DL	37898
34-090	GE-DL	37899
34-091	GE-DL	37900
34-092	GE-DL	37901
34-093	GE-DL	37902
34-094	GE-DL	37903
34-095	GE-DL	37904
34-096	GE-DL	37905
34-097	GE-DL	37906
34-098	GE-DL	37907
34-099	GE-DL	37908
34-100	GE-DL	37909
34-101	GE-DL	37910
34-102	GE-DL	37911
34-103	GE-DL	37912
34-104	GE-DL	37913
34-105	GE-DL	37914
34-106	GE-DL	37915
34-107	GE-DL	37916
34-108	GE-DL	37917
34-109	GE-DL	37918
34-110	GE-DL	37919
34-111	GE-DL	37920
34-112	GE-DL	37921
34-113	GE-DL	37922
34-114	GE-DL	37923
34-115	GE-DL	37924
34-116	GE-DL	37925
34-117	GE-DL	37926
34-118	GE-DL	37927
34-119	GE-DL	37928
34-120	GE-DL	37929
34-121	GE-DL	37930
34-122	GE-DL	37931
34-123	GE-DL	37932
34-124	GE-DL	37933
34-125	GE-DL	37934

== Liveries ==
With five exceptions, the Class 34-000 were all delivered in the SAR Gulf Red livery with signal red buffer beams, yellow side stripes on the long hood sides and a yellow V on each end. The five exceptions, numbers 34-055 to 34-059, were delivered in blue with a yellow V on the ends and yellow buffer beams for use on the Blue Train between Kimberley and Beaufort West. They were all eventually repainted in Spoornet’s orange livery after they were replaced in Blue Train service by seven Class 34-900 locomotives, numbers 34-924 to 34-930.

In the 1990s many of the Class 34-000 units began to be repainted in the Spoornet orange livery with a yellow and blue chevron pattern on the buffer beams. Several later received the Spoornet maroon livery. In the late 1990s many were repainted in the Spoornet blue livery with outline numbers on the long hood sides. After 2008 in the Transnet Freight Rail (TFR) and Passenger Rail Agency of South Africa (PRASA) era, many were repainted in the TFR red, green and yellow livery and at least four were repainted in the PRASA purple livery.

== Illustration ==
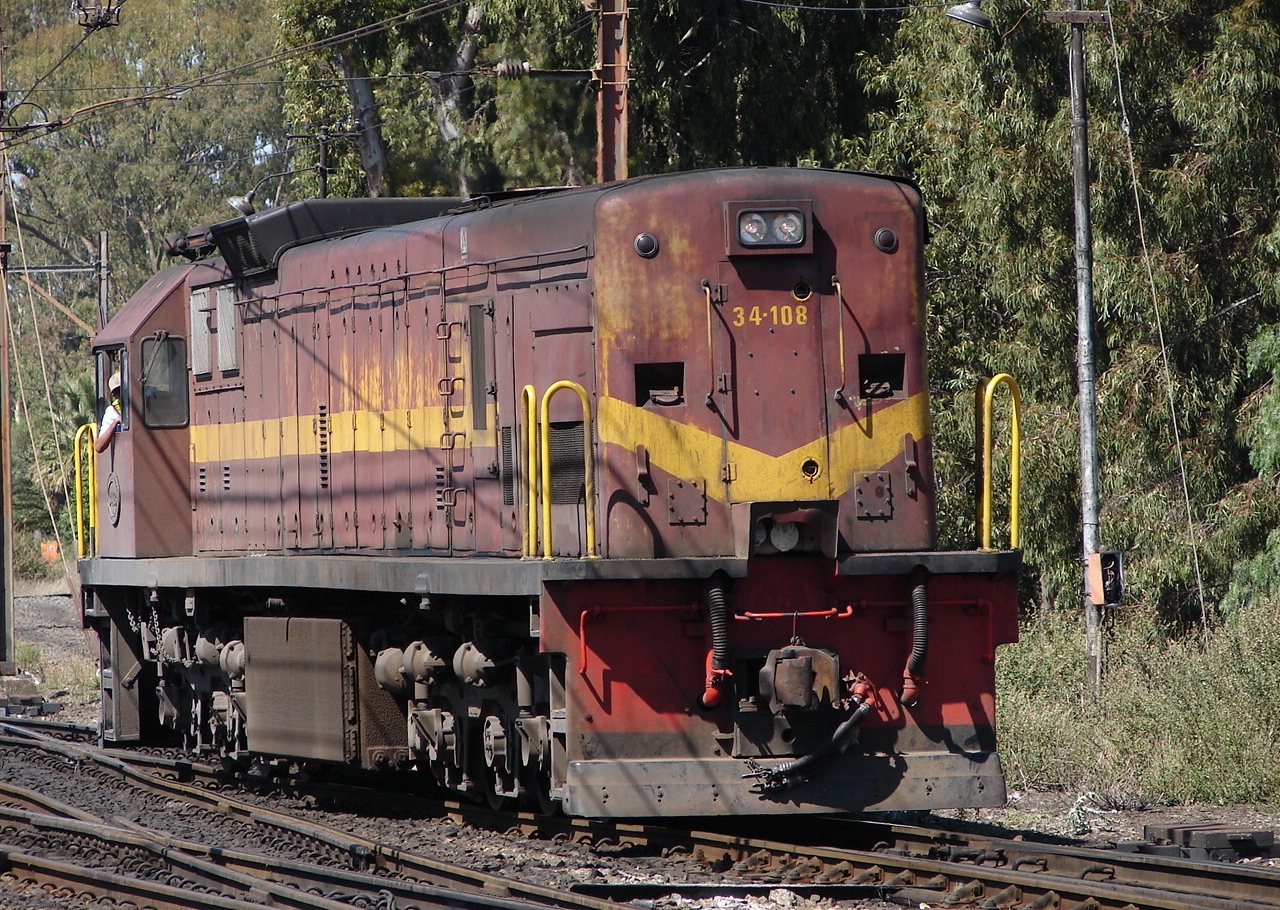
No. 34-108 in SAR Gulf Red and whiskers livery at Bloemfontein, Free State, 14 October 2009

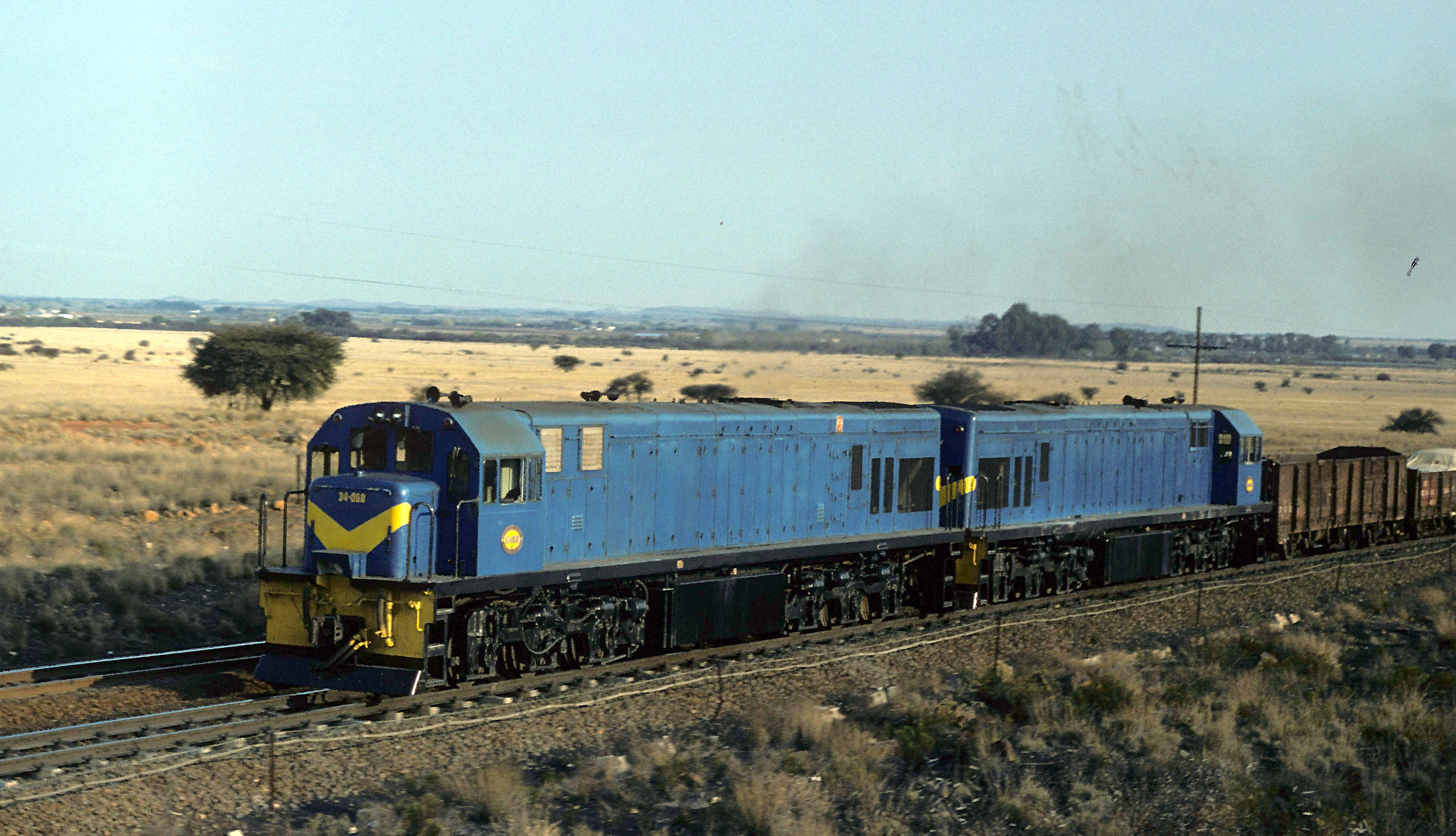
No. 34-058 and 34-059 in SAR Blue Train livery, still without saddle filters, at Modder River, Cape Province on 1 September 1975

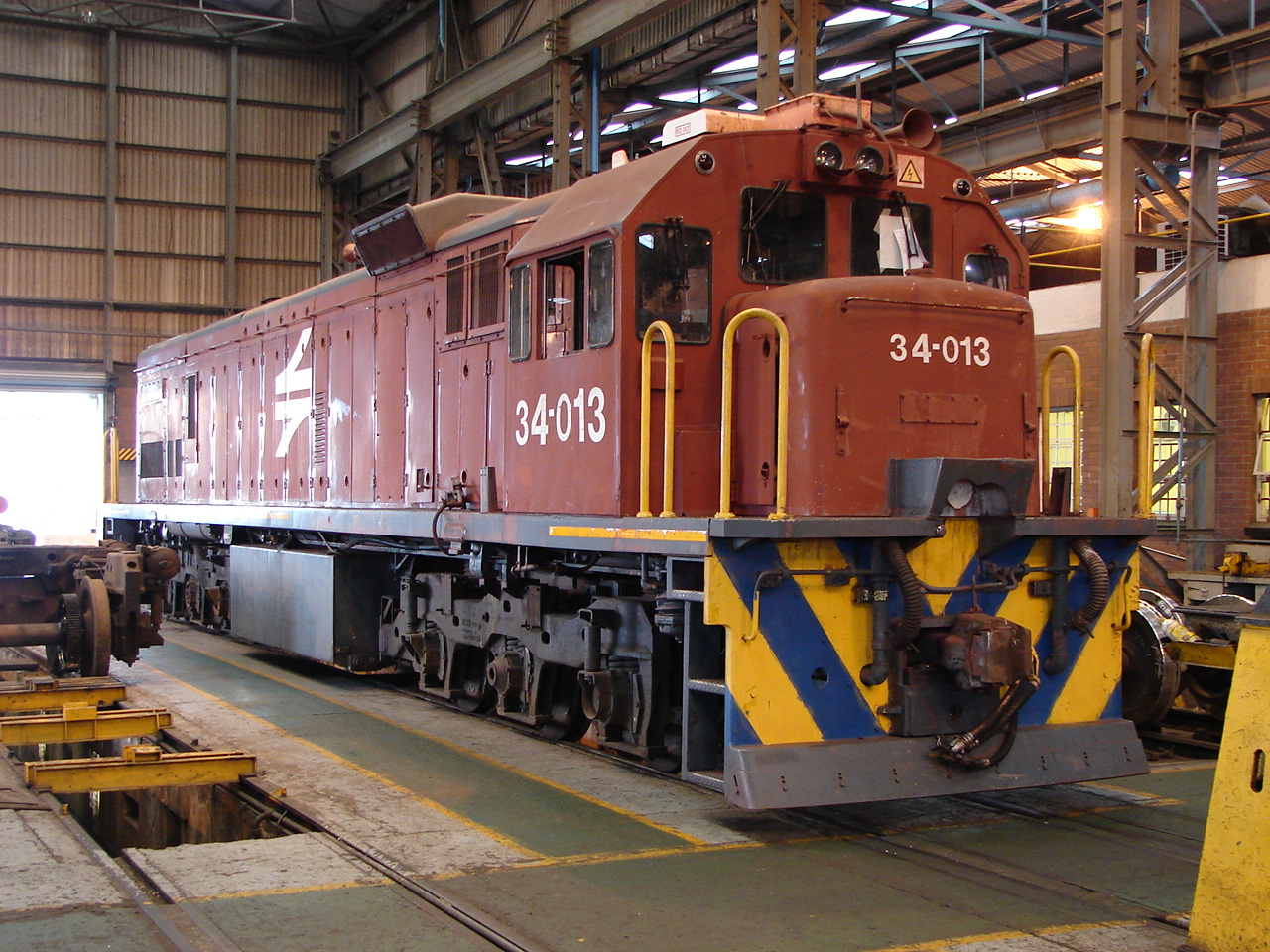
No. 34-013 in Spoornet maroon livery at Swartkops Loco Depot, Port Elizabeth, 20 April 2013

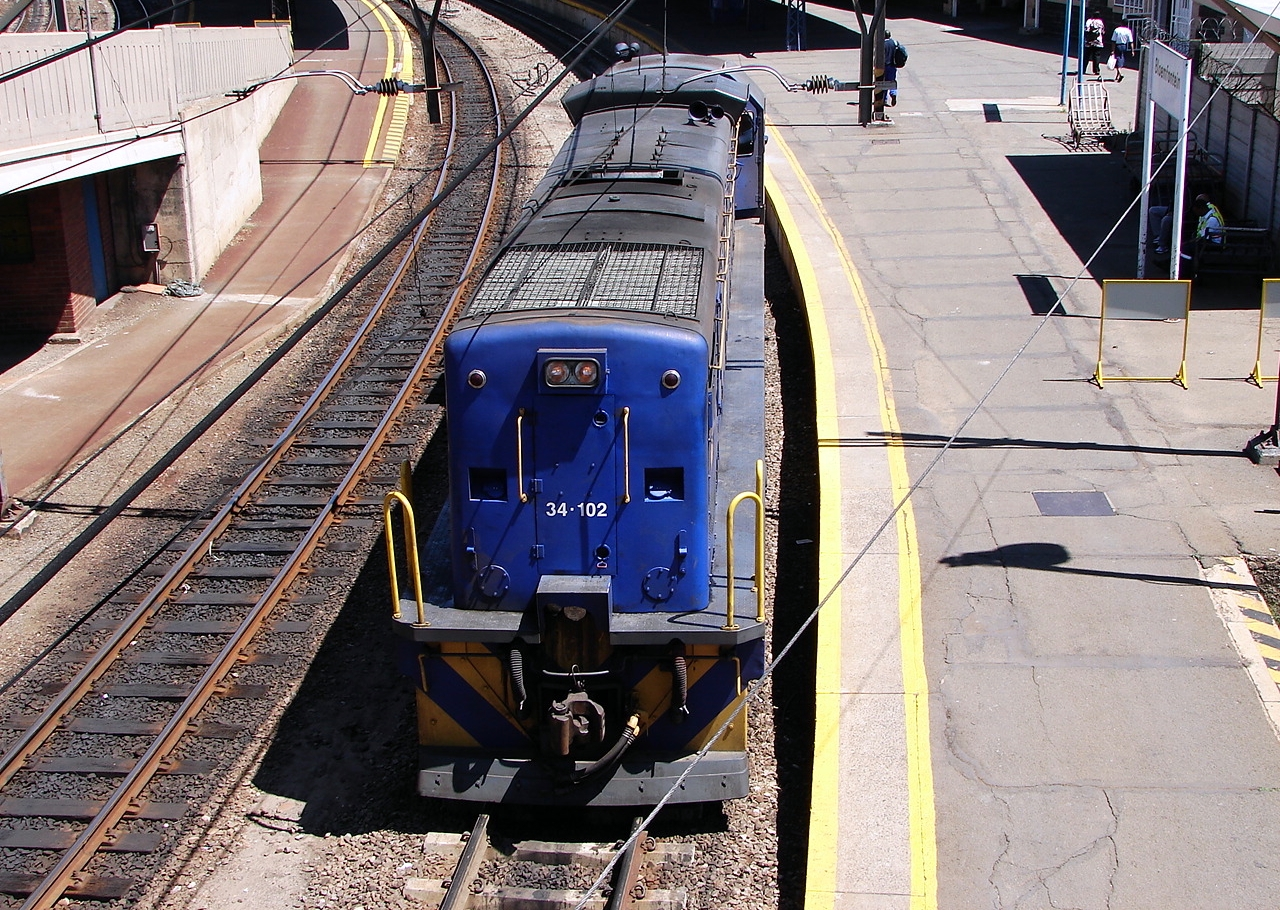
No. 34-102 in Spoornet blue livery with outline numbers at Bloemfontein, Free State, 14 October 2009

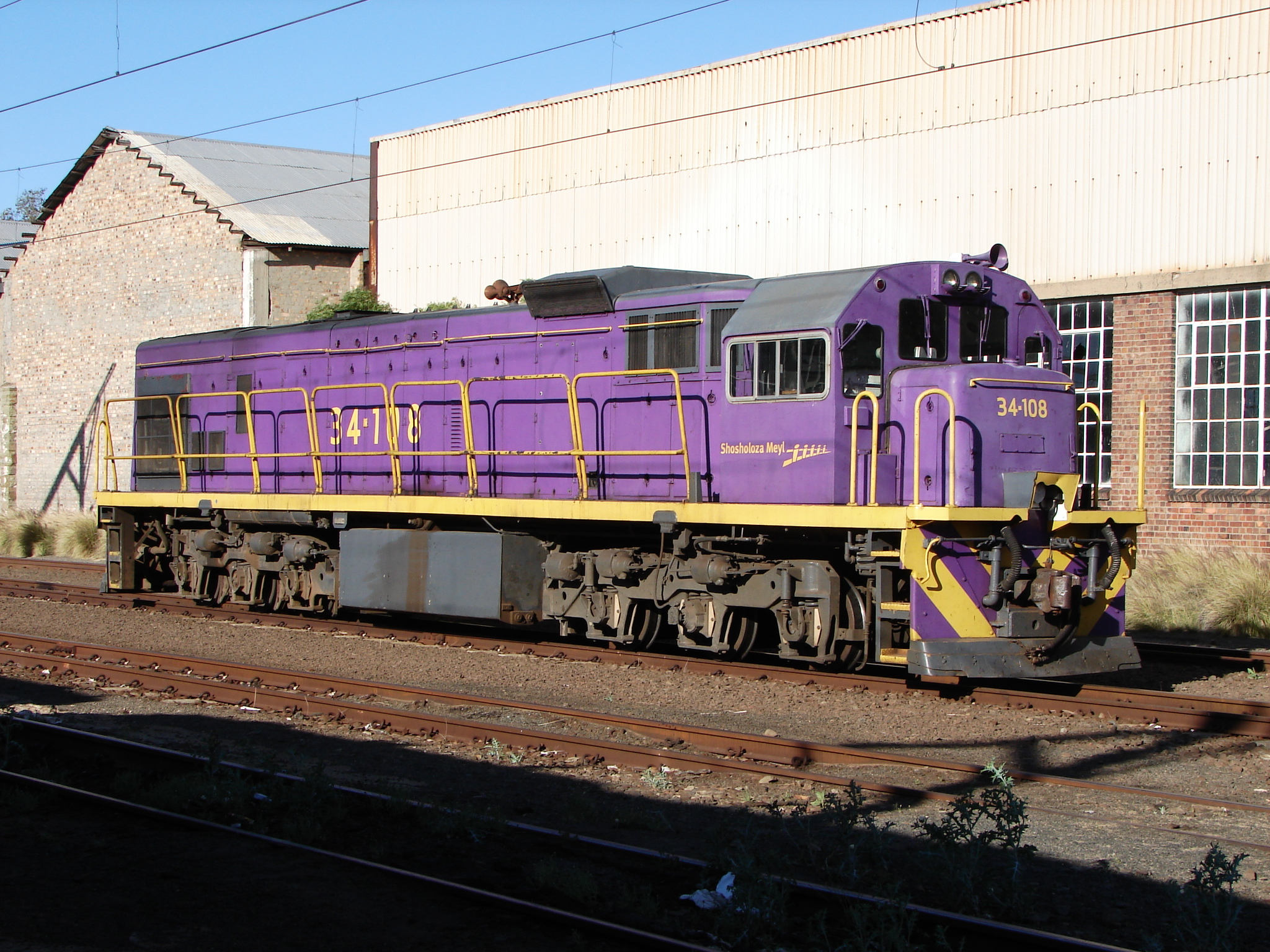
No. 34-108 in Passenger Rail Agency of South Africa's Shosholoza Meyl livery at Beaufort West, 10 October 2015

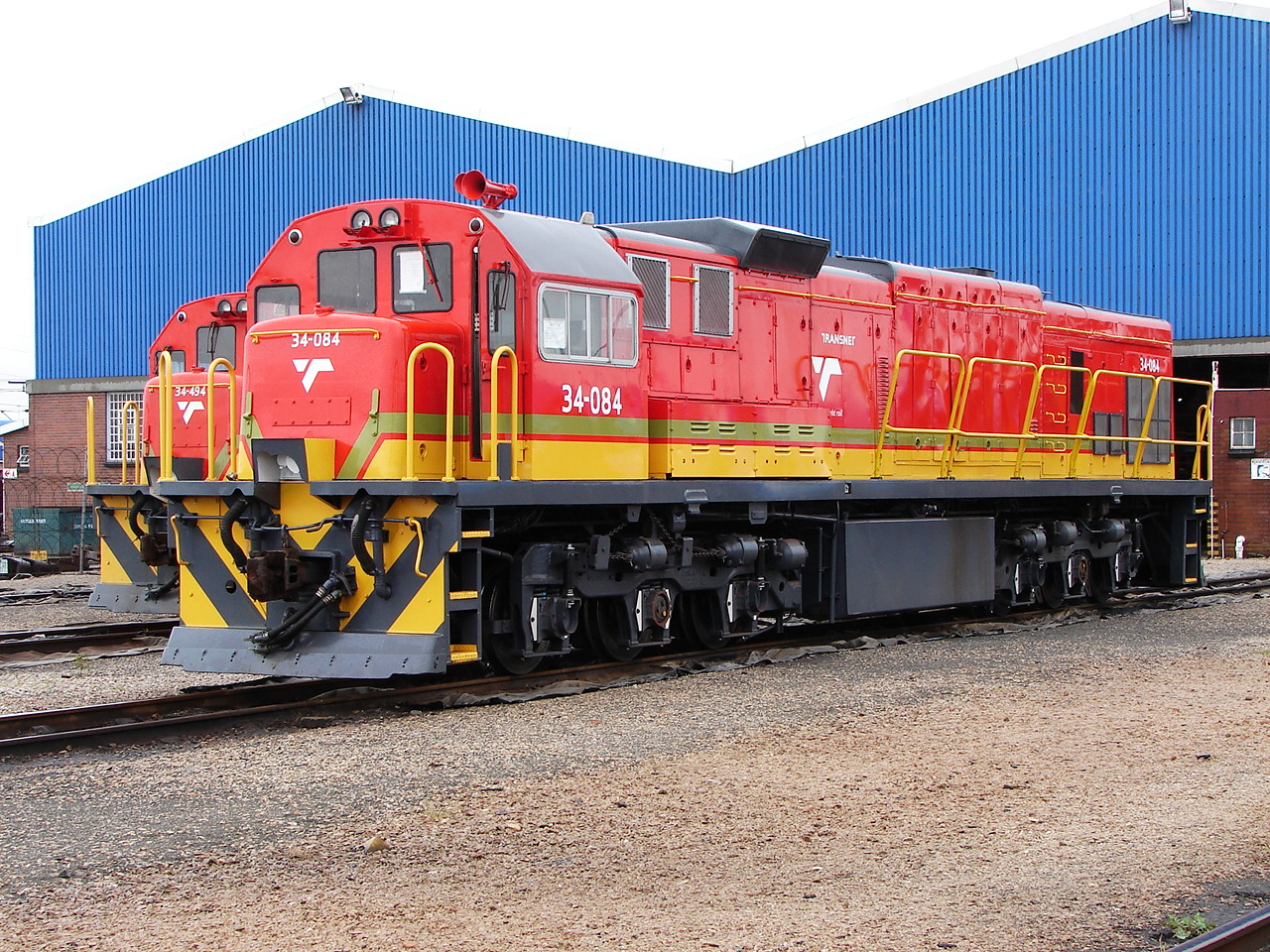
Bright Star equipped no. 34-084 in Transnet Freight Rail livery at Swartkops, 20 April 2013
