= South African Class 34-900 =

Type of diesel-electric locomotive

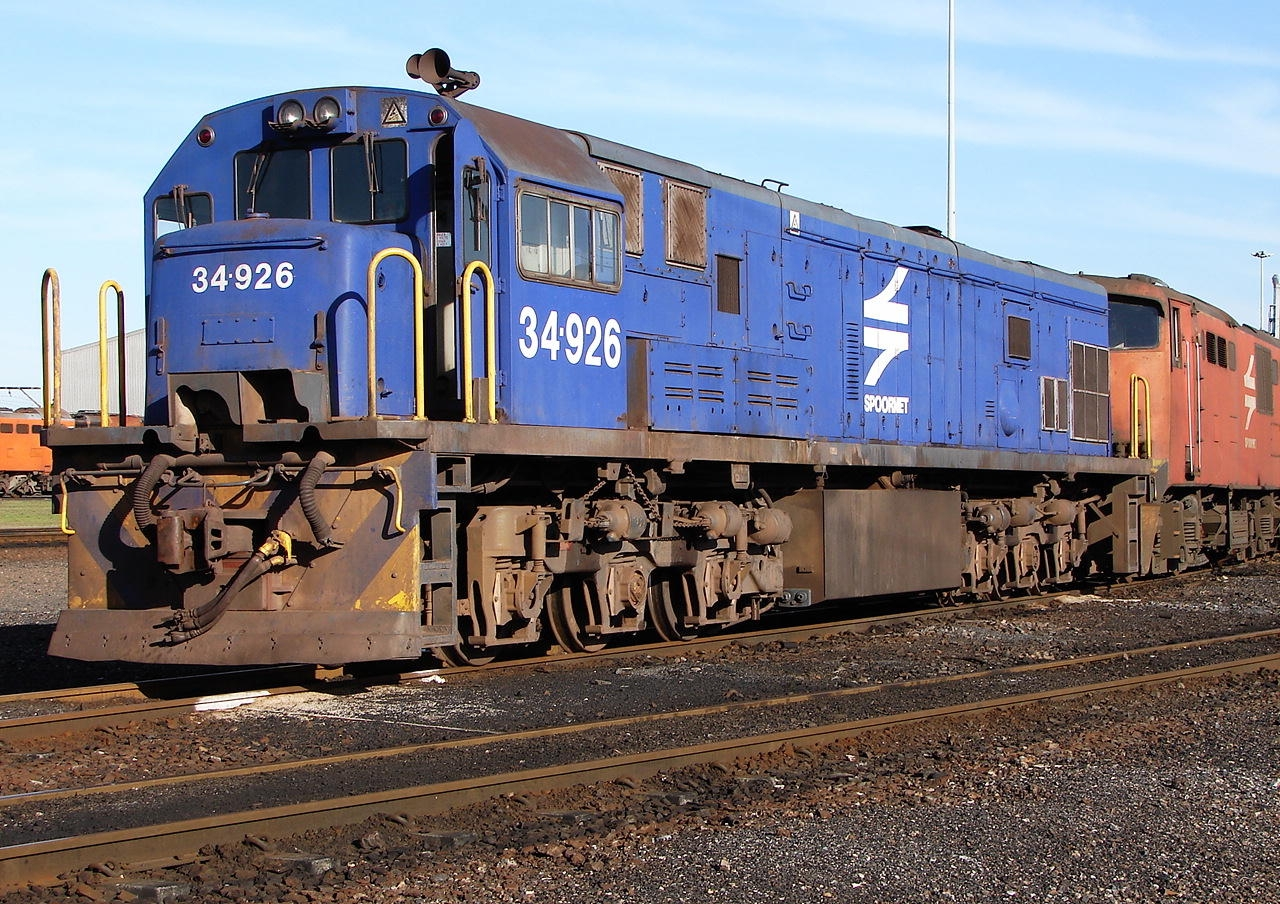
- No. 34-926, in Spoornet’s orange era Blue Train livery, at Bellville Depot, Cape Town, 15 May 2010
Type and origin
- Power type: Diesel-electric
- Designer: General Electric
- Builder: SA GE-DL Locomotive Group
- Serial number: 41350-41379
- Model: GE U26C
- Build date: 1980
- Total produced: 30
Specifications
- Configuration
  - AAR: C-C
  - UIC: Co'Co'
  - Commonwealth: Co+Co
- Gauge: 3 ft 6 in (1,067 mm) Cape gauge
- Wheel diameter: 915 mm (36 in)
- Wheelbase: 13,004 mm (42 ft 8 in)
  - Bogie: 3,188 mm (10 ft 6 in)
- Pivot centres: 10,058 mm (33 ft 0 in)
- Length
  - Over couplers: 17,982 mm (59 ft 0 in)
- Width: 2,756 mm (9 ft 1 in)
- Height: 3,962 mm (13 ft 0 in)
- Axle load: 18,850 kg (41,560 lb)
- Adhesive weight: 113,100 kg (249,300 lb)
- Loco weight: 113,100 kg (249,300 lb) max
- Fuel type: Diesel
- Fuel capacity: 5,400 litres (1,200 imp gal) as built 7,000 litres (1,500 imp gal) modified
- Prime mover: GE 7FDL-12
- RPM range: 450-1,050
  - RPM low idle: 450
  - RPM idle: 535
  - Maximum RPM: 1,050
- Engine type: 4-stroke diesel
- Aspiration: GE 7S14O8A1 turbocharger
- Alternator: 10 pole 3 phase GE 5GT-A11C1
- Traction motors: Six GE 5GE-761A13 DC 4 pole
  - Rating 1 hour: 665A
  - Continuous: 655A @ 24 km/h (15 mph)
- Cylinders: V12
- Gear ratio: 92:19
- MU working: 6 maximum
- Loco brake: 28-LAV-1 with vigilance control
- Train brakes: Westinghouse 6CDX4UC compressor/exhauster
- Air tank cap.: 825 litres (181 imp gal)
- Compressor: 0.039 m^{3}/s (1.4 cu ft/s)
- Exhauster: 0.155 m^{3}/s (5.5 cu ft/s)
- Couplers: AAR knuckle type E
Performance figures
- Maximum speed: 100 km/h (62 mph)
- Power output
  - Starting: 2,050 kW (2,750 hp)
  - Continuous: 1,940 kW (2,600 hp)
- Tractive effort
  - Starting: 272 kN (61,000 lbf) @ 25% adh.
  - Continuous: 218 kN (49,000 lbf) @ 26 km/h (16 mph)
- Factor of adh.
  - Starting: 25%
  - Continuous: 20%
- Brakeforce: 60% ratio @ 345 kPa (50.0 psi)
- Dynamic brake peak effort: 180 kN (40,000 lbf) @ 29 km/h (18 mph)
Career
- Operators: South African Railways; Spoornet; Transnet Freight Rail
- Class: Class 34-900
- Number in class: 30
- Numbers: 34-901 to 34-930
- Delivered: 1980-1981
- First run: 1980

The South African Railways Class 34–900 of 1980 is a diesel-electric locomotive.

In 1980 and 1981, the South African Railways placed thirty Class 34–900 General Electric type U26C diesel-electric locomotives in service.

== Manufacturer ==
The Class 34-900 type GE U26C diesel-electric locomotive was designed by General Electric and built for the South African Railways (SAR) by the South African General Electric-Dorman Long Locomotive Group (SA GE-DL, later Dorbyl). Thirty locomotives were delivered in 1980 and 1981, numbered in the range from 34-901 to 34-930.

== Distinguishing features ==
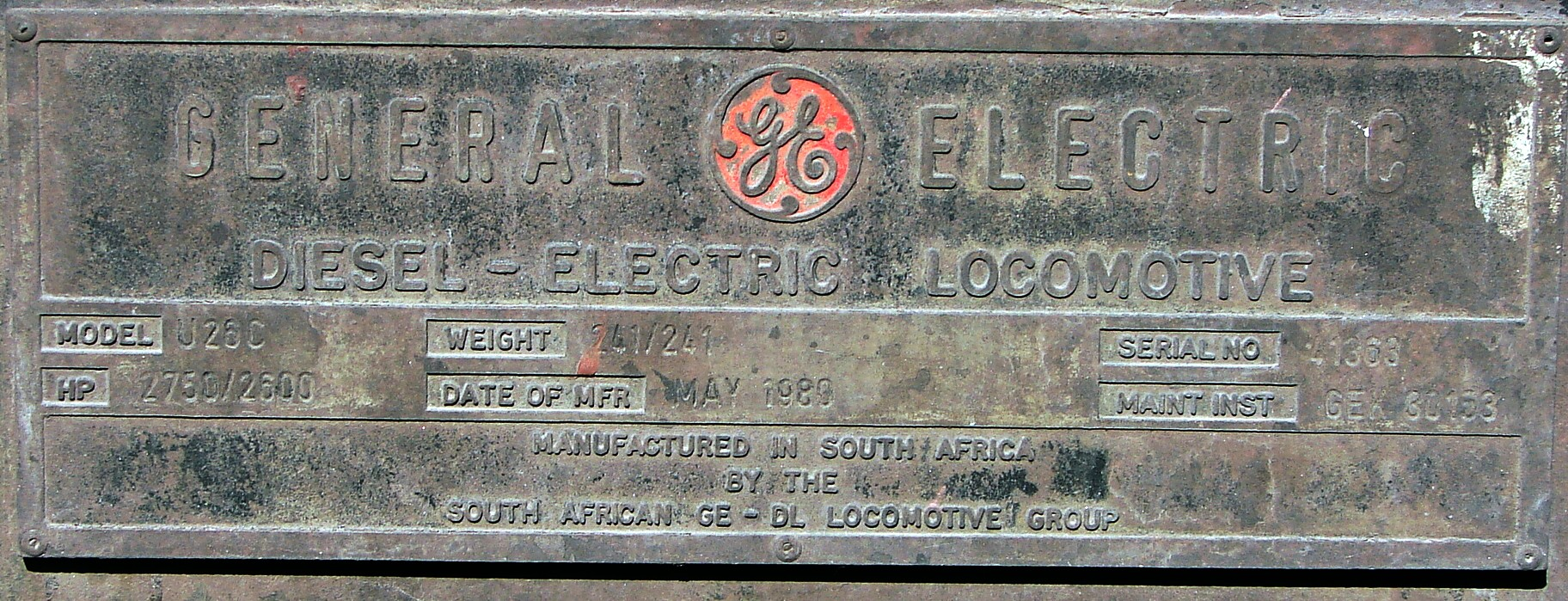
SA GE-DL Builder's plate on 34-914

As built, the GE Classes 34-000, 34-400 and 34-900 were visually indistinguishable from each other. The ex Iscor Class 34-500 locomotives could be visually distinguished from the other series by the air conditioning units mounted on the cab roofs of most of them and initially, when it was still a feature unique to them, by their running board-mounted handrails.

At some stage during the mid-1980s, all Class 34-000, 34-400 and 34-500 locomotives had saddle filters installed across the long hood, mounted just to the rear of the screens on the sides behind the cab. Since then, Class 34-900 locomotives could be distinguished from the older models by the absence of the saddle filter.

== Modifications ==
=== Fuel capacity ===
As built, the Class 34-900 had a 5,400 litres (1,200 imperial gallons) fuel tank and interlinked bogies, while the Class 34-500 was delivered new to Iscor with a 7,000 litres (1,500 imperial gallons) fuel tank to cope with the lack of en route refueling points on the Sishen-Saldanha iron ore line. To accommodate the larger fuel tank, the inter-bogie linkage found on all other models was omitted on the Class 34-500.

To be usable on the iron ore line, Class 34-900 locomotives which ended up working there were modified to a similar fuel capacity. The inter-bogie linkage was removed and the fuel tank was enlarged by changing it from saddle-shaped to rectangular box-shaped. To maintain its lateral balance, a slab of metal was attached to each bogie in place of the removed linkage. In the second picture, the weld lines on the end of the enlarged fuel tank as well as the metal slab at the end of the bogie are visible.

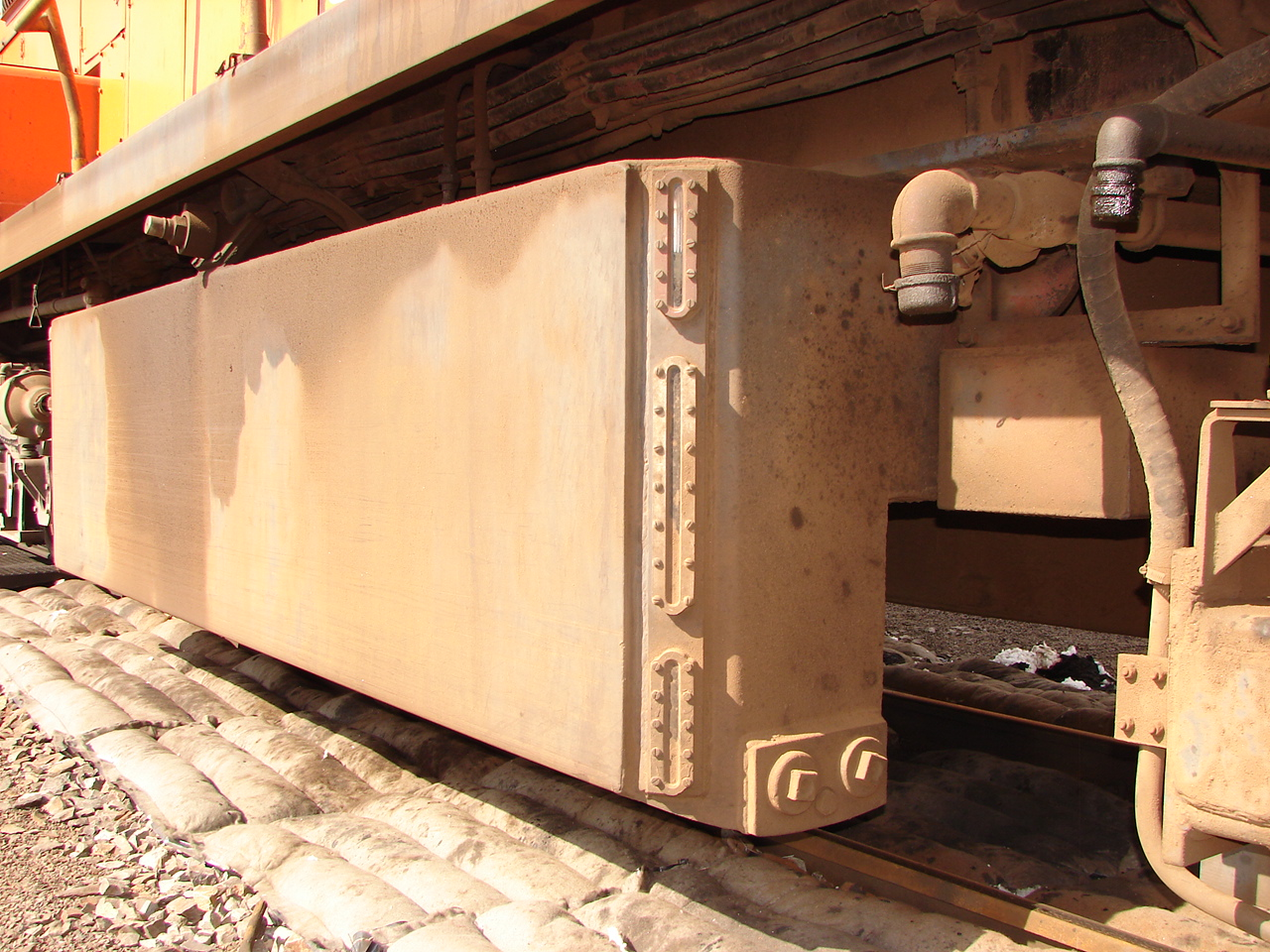
Standard 5,400 litre fuel tank

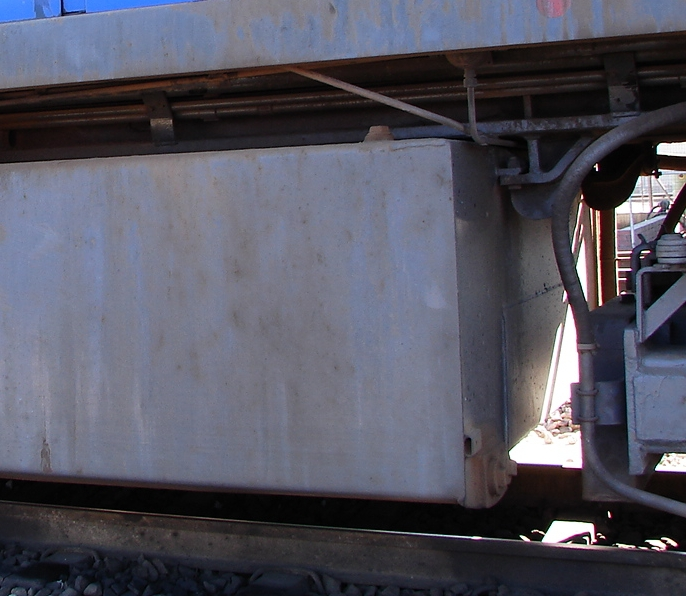
Enlarged 7,000 litre fuel tank

=== Running board-mounted handrails ===
Class 34-900 locomotives which are allocated to the Sishen-Saldanha Orex line are usually further modified by having removable running board-mounted handrails installed. All South African diesel-electric locomotives have their side handrails mounted along the upper edges of their long hoods. The ex Iscor Class 34-500s, however, came equipped with additional removable running board-mounted handrails. Since these handrails are slide-fit into brackets welded onto the running board, they are easily removed.

=== Electronic control system ===
Beginning in 2010, some locomotives were equipped with electronic fuel injection and GE Bright Star control systems. On some of the first locomotives which were so modified, externally visible evidence of the modification is a raised middle portion of the long hood. All Bright Star-equipped locomotives emerged from this modification repainted in the Transnet Freight Rail livery.

== Service ==
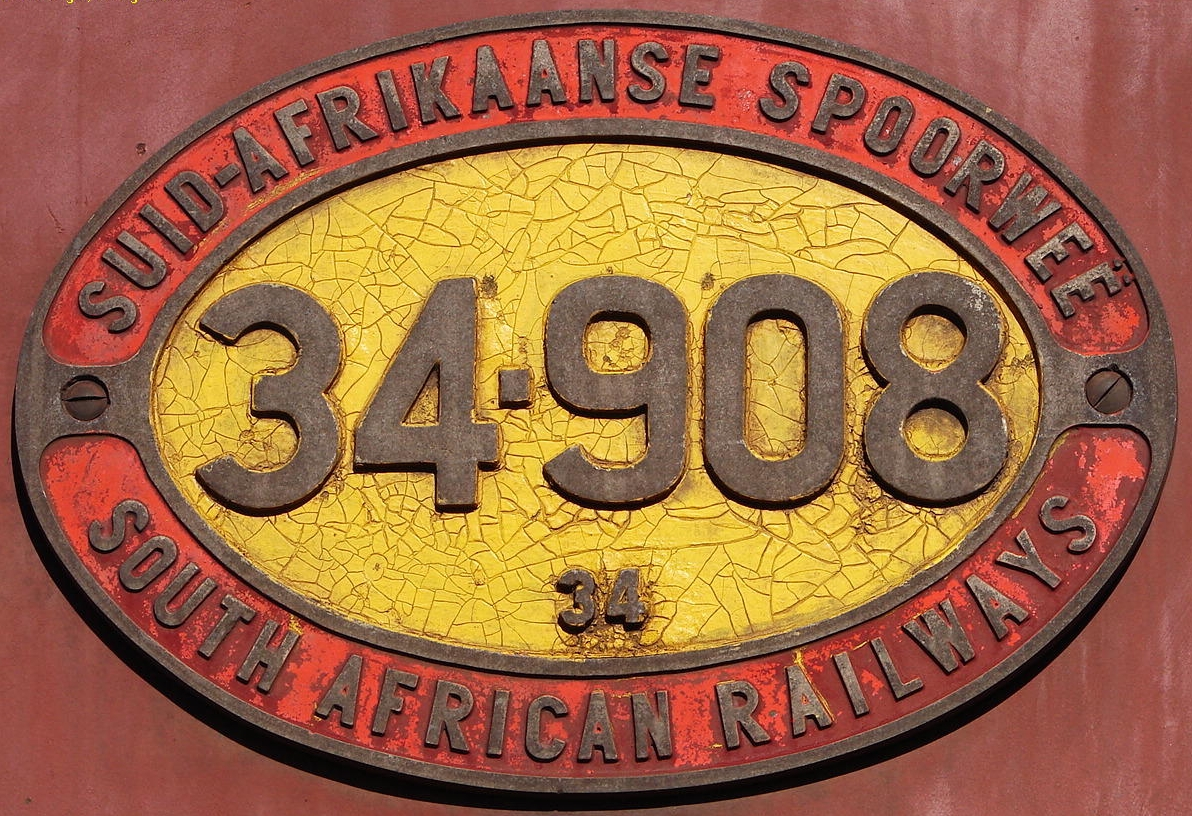

Class 34-900 locomotives work on most mainlines and some branchlines in the central, western, southern and southeastern parts of the country. Some eventually joined the Class 34-500 on the 861 kilometres (535 miles) Sishen-Saldanha iron ore line to haul export ore from the open cast iron mines at Sishen in the Northern Cape to the harbour at Saldanha in the Western Cape.

On the Sishen–Saldanha Orex line, GE Class 34 series diesel-electric locomotives run consisted to Class 9E and Class 15E electric locomotives to haul the 342-truck iron ore trains. Each truck has a 100-ton capacity and the trains are at least 3.72 kilometres (2.31 miles) in length, powered by mixed consists of Class 9E and Class 15E electric and type GE U26C Class 34-000, 34-400, 34-500, 34-900 and, from 2012, type GE C30ACi Class 43-000 diesel-electric locomotives. In South Africa, mixed electric and diesel-electric consists are unique to the iron ore line.

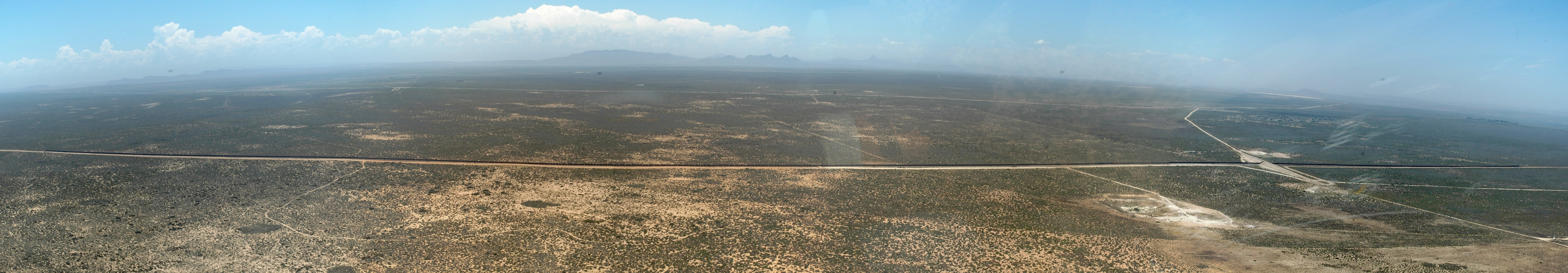
Ore train about 100 kilometres (62 miles) north of Lamberts Bay

== Works numbers ==
The Class 34-900 builder's works numbers are listed in the table.

Class 34-900, GE type U26C
Loco no.	Works no.	Special livery
34-901	41350	
34-902	41351	
34-903	41352	
34-904	41353	
34-905	41354	
34-906	41355	
34-907	41356	
34-908	41357	
34-909	41358	
34-910	41359	
34-911	41360	
34-912	41361	
34-913	41362	
34-914	41363	
34-915	41364	
34-916	41365	
34-917	41366	
34-918	41367	
34-919	41368	
34-920	41369	
34-921	41370	
34-922	41371	
34-923	41372	
34-924	41373	Blue train
34-925	41374	Blue train
34-926	41375	Blue train
34-927	41376	Blue train
34-928	41377	Blue train
34-929	41378	Blue train
34-930	41379	Blue train

== Liveries ==
All but seven Class 34-900 locomotives were delivered in the SAR Gulf Red livery with signal red buffer beams, yellow side stripes on the long hood sides and a yellow V on each end. In the 1990s many of the Class 34-900 units began to be repainted in the Spoornet orange livery with a yellow and blue chevron pattern on the buffer beams. In the late 1990s many were repainted in the Spoornet blue livery with outline numbers on the long hood sides. After 2008 in the Transnet Freight Rail (TFR) era, many were repainted in the TFR red, green and yellow livery.

The seven exceptions, numbers 34-924 to 34-930, were painted in the SAR Blue Train livery and took the place of the five SAR Blue Train liveried Class 34-000 locomotives, numbers 34-055 to 34-059 which were then all eventually repainted in Spoornet's orange livery. Some of the Class 34-900 locomotives, numbers 34-925 to 34-927, 34-929 and 34-930, were later repainted in Spoornet's orange era Blue Train livery, while the other two, numbers 34-924 and 34-928, received the Spoornet blue with outline numbers livery.

== Illustration ==
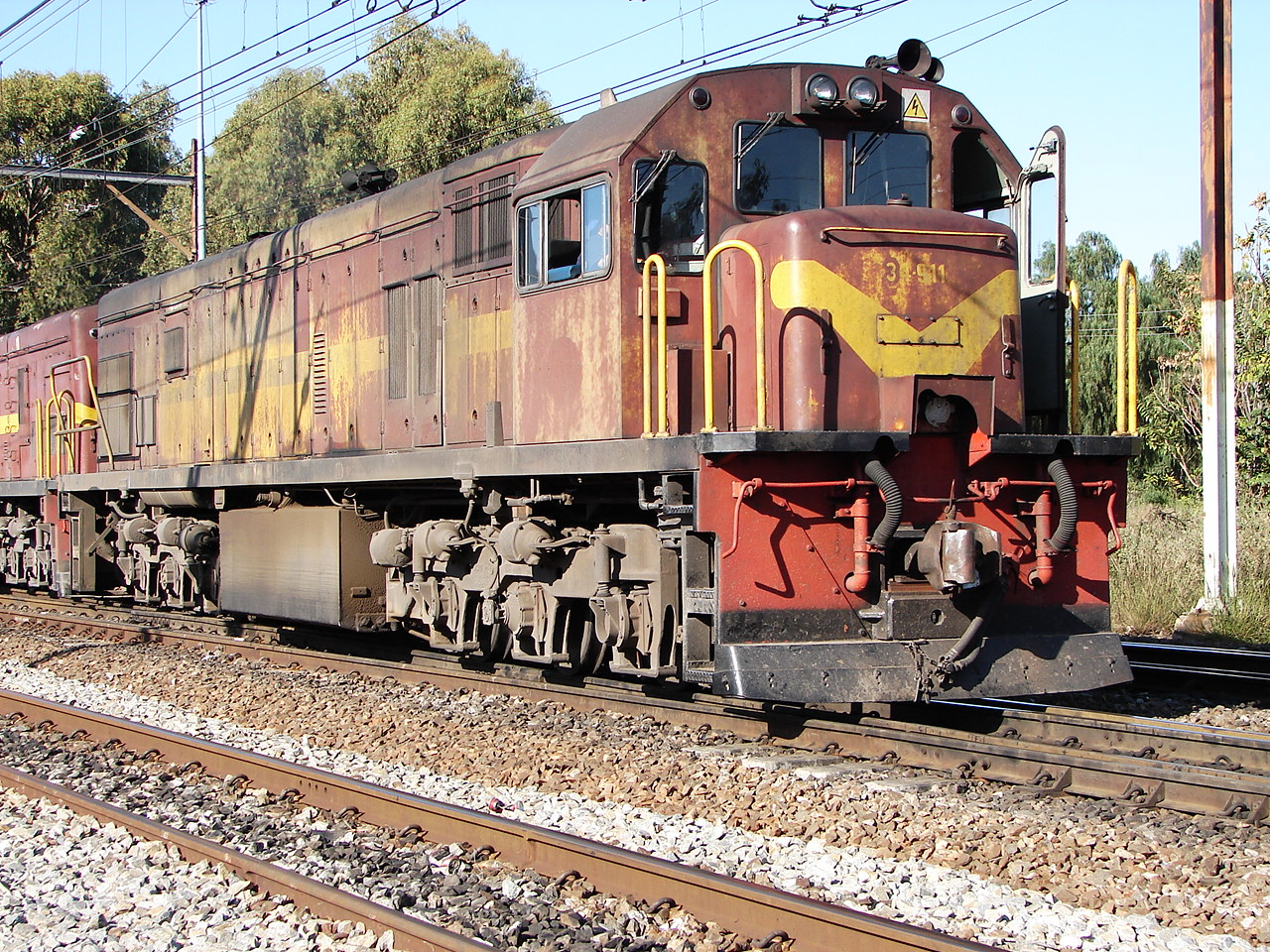
No. 34–911 in SAR Gulf Red and whiskers livery, Bloemfontein, 30 April 2013

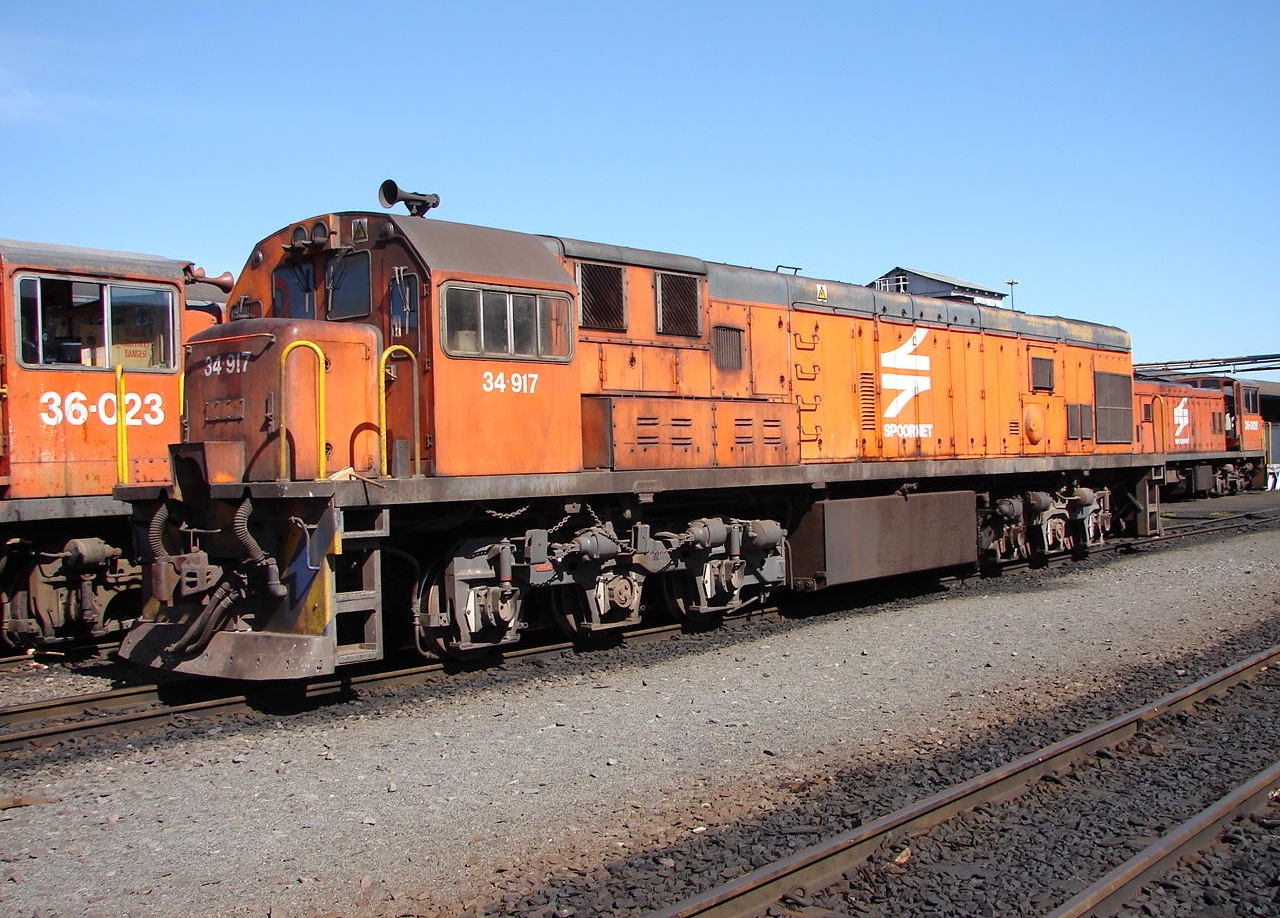
No. 34–917 at Bellville, Cape Town, Western Cape, in Spoornet orange livery, 25 October 2007

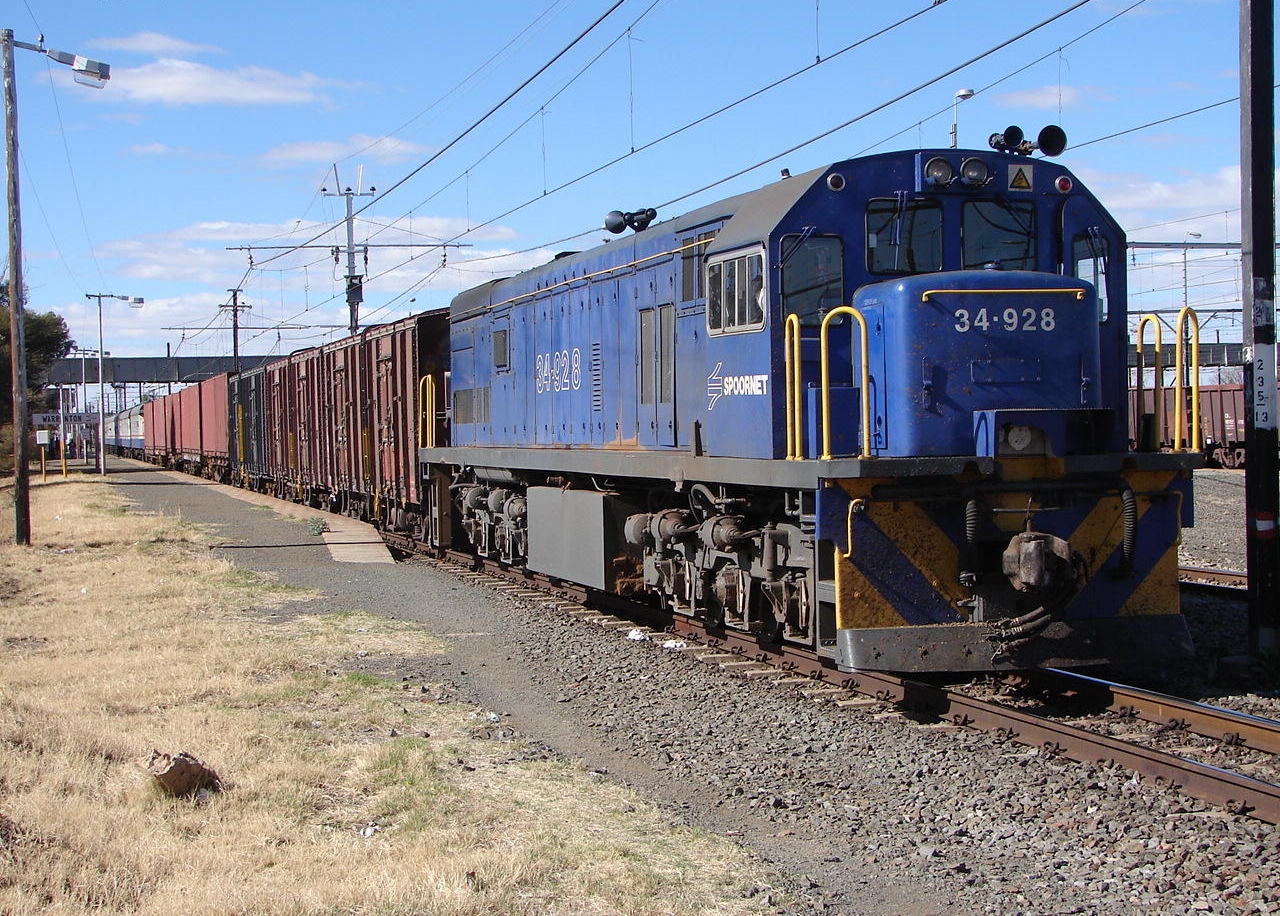
No. 34–928 at Warrenton, Northern Cape, in Spoornet blue livery with outline numbers, 24 August 2007

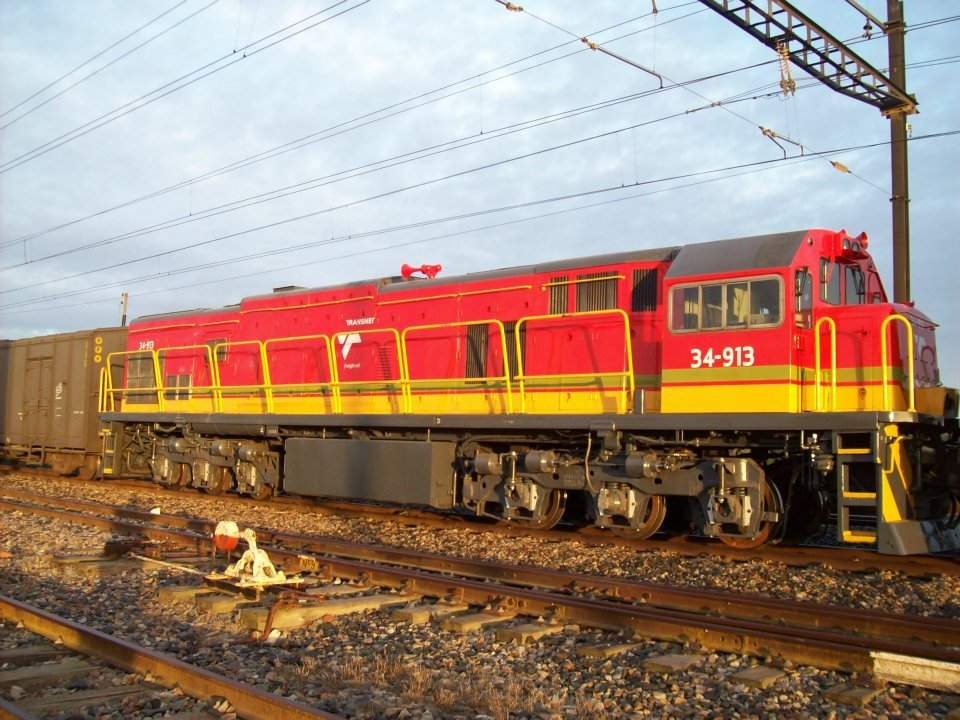
"Bright Star" equipped no. 34–913 in Transnet Freight Rail livery at Addo, Eastern Cape, 13 July 2012
