= South African Class 34-400 =

Type of diesel-electric locomotive

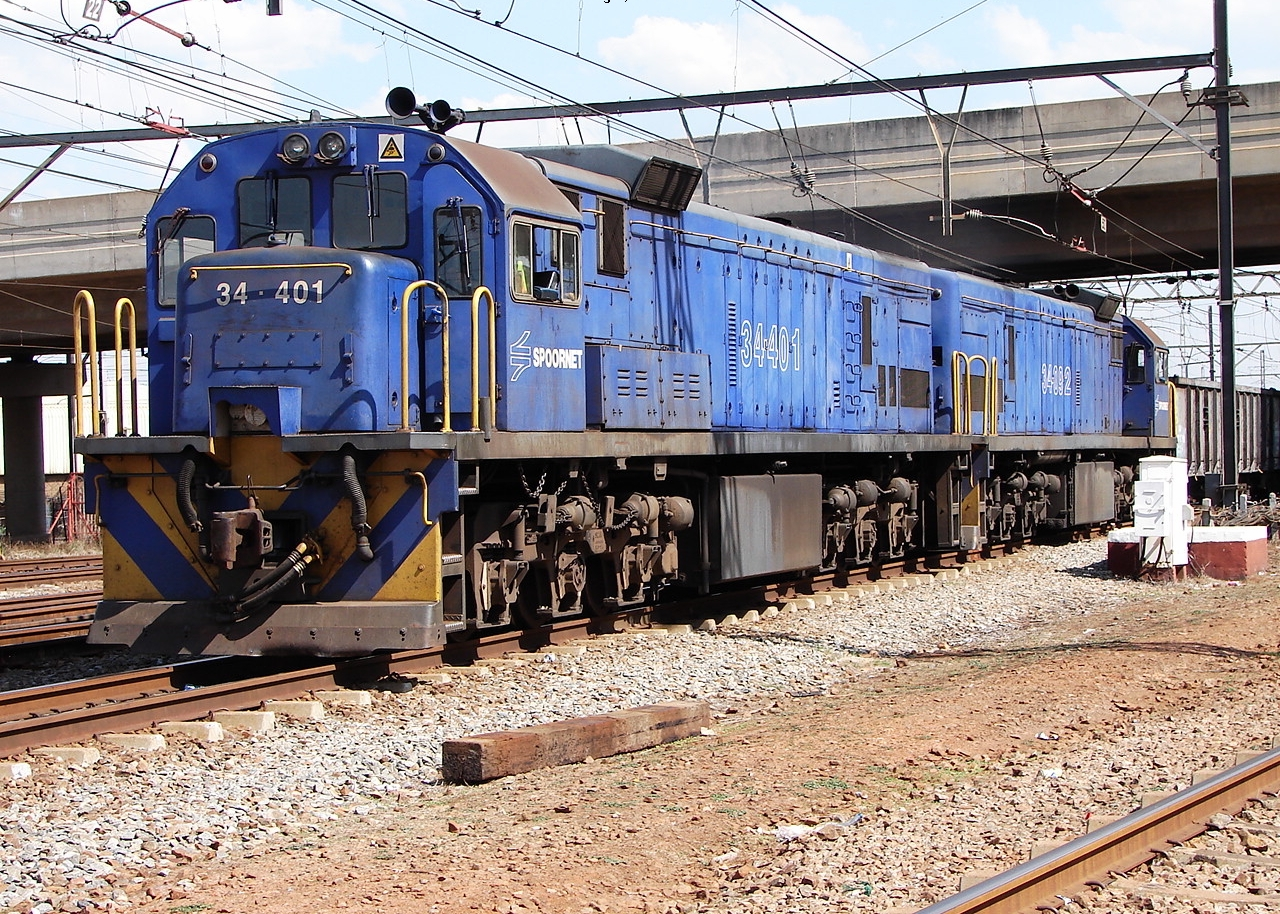
- No. 34-401 at Kaalfontein, Gauteng, 7 October 2009
Type and origin
- Power type: Diesel-electric
- Designer: General Electric
- Builder: SA GE-DL Locomotive Group
- Serial number: 38623-38722
- Model: GE U26C
- Build date: 1973–1974
- Total produced: 100
Specifications
- Configuration
  - AAR: C-C
  - UIC: Co'Co'
  - Commonwealth: Co+Co
- Gauge: 3 ft 6 in (1,067 mm) Cape gauge
- Wheel diameter: 915 mm (36.0 in)
- Wheelbase: 13,004 mm (42 ft 8.0 in)
  - Bogie: 3,188 mm (10 ft 5.5 in)
- Pivot centres: 10,058 mm (33 ft 0 in)
- Length
  - Over couplers: 17,982 mm (59 ft 0 in)
- Width: 2,756 mm (9 ft 0.5 in)
- Height: 3,962 mm (13 ft 0 in)
- Axle load: 18,850 kg (41,560 lb)
- Adhesive weight: 113,100 kg (249,300 lb)
- Loco weight: 113,100 kg (249,300 lb) max
- Fuel type: Diesel
- Fuel capacity: 5,400 litres (1,200 imp gal) new 7,000 litres (1,500 imp gal) mod.
- Prime mover: GE FDL-12
- RPM range: 450-1,050
  - RPM low idle: 450
  - RPM idle: 535
  - Maximum RPM: 1,050
- Engine type: 4-stroke diesel
- Aspiration: Elliott H-581 turbocharger
- Alternator: 10 pole 3 phase GE 5GT-A11C1
- Traction motors: Six GE 5GE-761A13 DC 4 pole
  - Rating 1 hour: 665A
  - Continuous: 655A @ 24 km/h (15 mph)
- Cylinders: V12
- Gear ratio: 92:19
- MU working: 6 maximum
- Loco brake: 28-LAV-1 with vigilance control
- Train brakes: Westinghouse 6CDX4UC compressor/exhauster
- Air tank cap.: 825 litres (181 imp gal)
- Compressor: 0.039 m^{3}/s (1.4 cu ft/s)
- Exhauster: 0.155 m^{3}/s (5.5 cu ft/s)
- Couplers: AAR knuckle type E
Performance figures
- Maximum speed: 100 km/h (62 mph)
- Power output
  - Starting: 2,050 kW (2,750 hp)
  - Continuous: 1,940 kW (2,600 hp)
- Tractive effort
  - Starting: 272 kN (61,000 lbf) @ 25% adhesion
  - Continuous: 218 kN (49,000 lbf) @ 26 km/h (16 mph)
- Factor of adh.
  - Starting: 25%
  - Continuous: 20%
- Brakeforce: 60% ratio @ 345 kPa (50.0 psi)
- Dynamic brake peak effort: 180 kN (40,000 lbf) @ 29 km/h (18 mph)
Career
- Operators: South African Railways; Spoornet; Kenya Railways; Sheltam; Sasol; Blue Circle; Transnet Freight Rail
- Class: Class 34-400
- Number in class: 100
- Numbers: 34-401 to 34-500
- Delivered: 1973–1974
- First run: 1973

The South African Railways Class 34-400 of 1973 is a diesel-electric locomotive.

Between April 1973 and November 1974, the South African Railways placed one hundred Class 34-400 General Electric type U26C diesel-electric locomotives in service.

== Manufacturer ==
The Class 34-400 type GE U26C diesel-electric locomotive was designed by General Electric (GE) and built for the South African Railways (SAR) by the South African General Electric-Dorman Long Locomotive Group (SA GE-DL, later Dorbyl). One hundred locomotives were delivered between April 1973 and November 1974, numbered in the range from 34-401 to 34-500.

== Distinguishing features ==
As built, the GE Classes 34-000, 34-400 and 34-900 locomotives were visually indistinguishable from each other. The Class 34-500 locomotives could be distinguished from the other series by the air conditioning units mounted on their cab roofs and initially, when it was still a feature unique to them, by their running board mounted handrails. At some stage during the mid-1980s, all Class 34-000, 34-400 and 34-500 locomotives had saddle filters installed across the long hood, mounted just to the rear of the screens behind the cab on the sides. Since then, Class 34-900 locomotives could be distinguished from the older models by the absence of the saddle filter.

== Modifications ==
=== Fuel capacity ===
As built, the Class 34-400 had a 5,400-litre (1,200-imperial-gallon) fuel tank and interlinked bogies, while the Class 34-500 was delivered new to Iscor with a 7,000-litre (1,500-imperial-gallon) fuel tank to cope with the lack of en route refuelling points on the Sishen-Saldanha iron ore line. To facilitate the larger fuel tank, the inter-bogie linkage found on all other models had to be omitted on the Class 34-500.

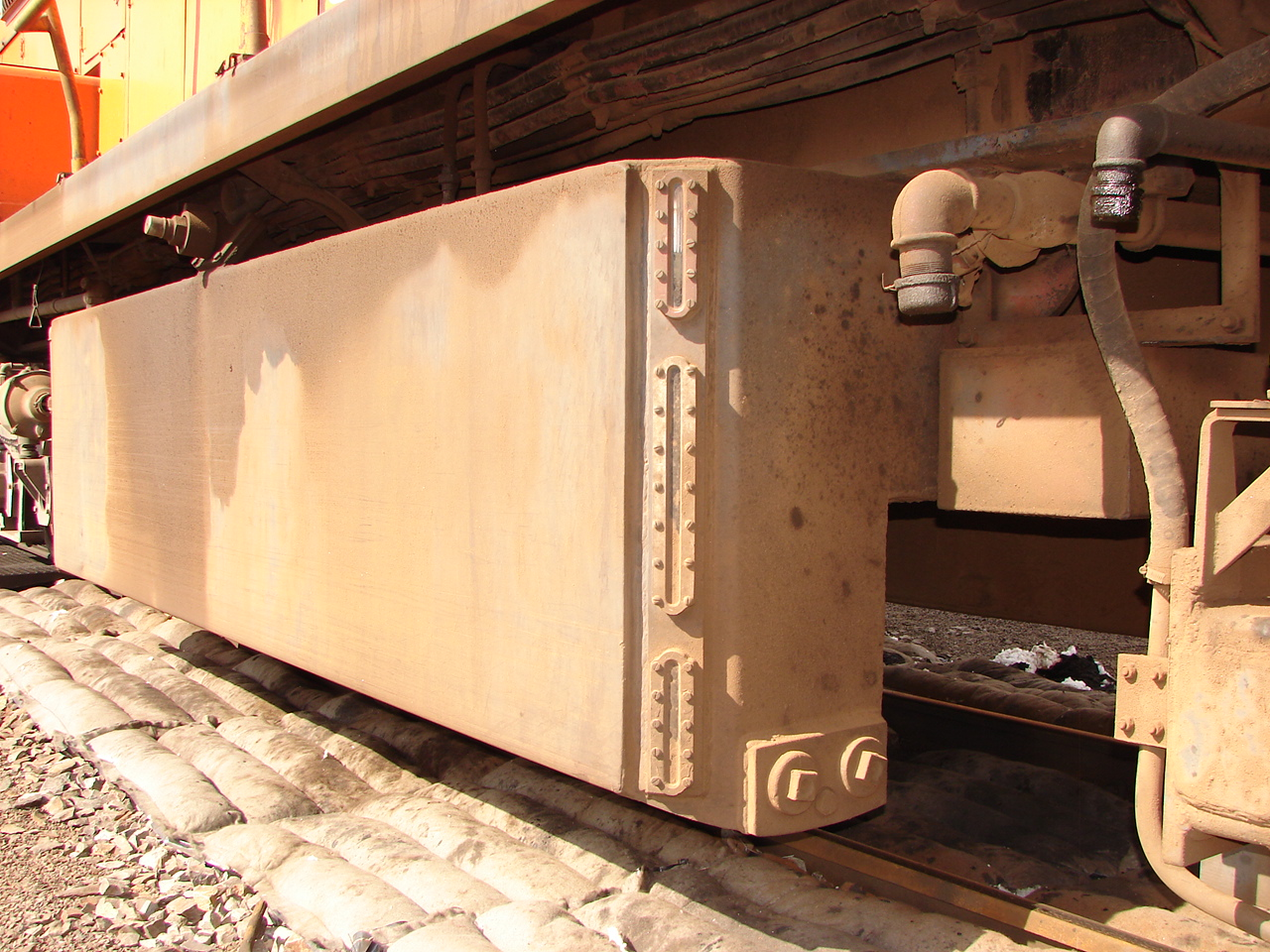
Standard 5,400 litre fuel tank

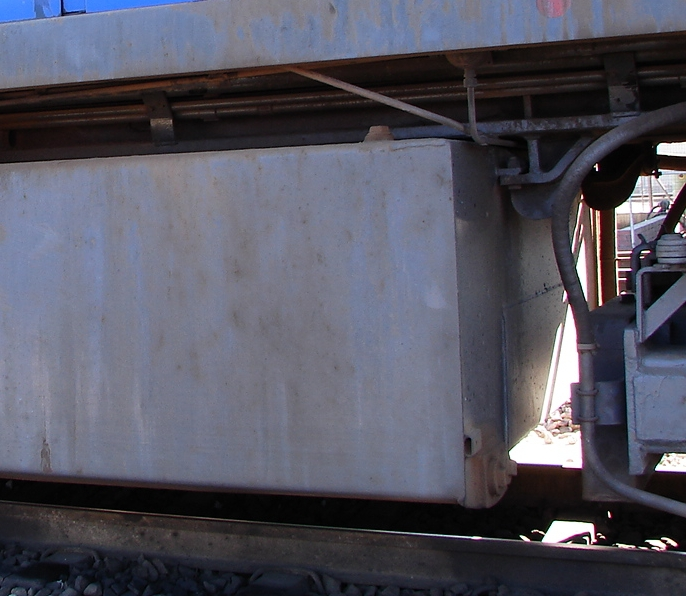
Enlarged 7,000 litre fuel tank

To be usable on the iron ore line, Class 34-400 units which ended up working there were modified to a similar fuel capacity. The inter-bogie linkage was removed and the fuel tank was enlarged by changing it from saddle-shaped to rectangular box-shaped. To maintain its lateral balance, a slab of metal was attached to each bogie in place of the removed linkage. In the second picture, the weld lines on the end of the enlarged fuel tank as well as the metal slab at the end of the bogie are visible.

=== Electronic control system ===
Beginning in 2010, some units were equipped with electronic fuel injection and GE "Brite Star" control systems. On some of the first locomotives to be so modified, externally visible evidence of the modification is a raised middle portion of the long hood.

== Service ==
=== South African Railways ===
GE Class 34-400s work on most mainlines and some branch lines in the central, western, southern and southeastern parts of the country. On the busy line from Krugersdorp via Zeerust to Mafeking, the Class 34-400 became the standard motive power.

Some eventually joined the Class 34-500 on the 861-kilometre-long (535-mile) Sishen-Saldanha iron ore line, to haul export ore from the open cast iron mines at Sishen near Kathu in the Northern Cape to the harbour at Saldanha in the Western Cape. Here they ran consisted to electric locomotives to haul the 342 wagon iron ore trains. Each wagon has a 100-ton capacity and the trains are at least 3.72 kilometres (2.31 miles) in length. In South Africa, mixed electric and diesel-electric consists are unique to the iron ore line.

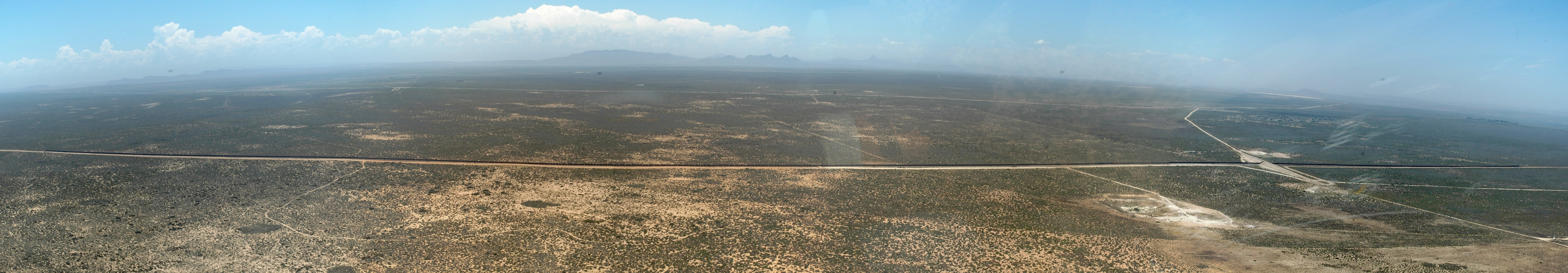
Ore train about 100 kilometres (62 miles) north of Lamberts Bay

=== Leased and sold ===
Eleven Class 34-400s were leased to the Kenya Railways for some years, regauged to 1,000 mm (3 ft 3 3/8 in) and renumbered in the range from 9501 to 9511. They were returned to Spoornet in April 2002.

Several Class 34-400s were sold into industry. No. 34-429 went to the Douglas Colliery near Witbank as no. D10. Five went to Sasol at Trichardt near Secunda and two to Blue Circle Cement at Lichtenburg.

No. 34-426, with the bodywork removed, is used for apprentice training at the Germiston diesel depot.

== Works numbers ==
The Class 34-400 builder's works numbers and known deployment are listed in the table.

Class 34-400, GE type U26C
SAR No.	GE-DL works no.	Disposal	Post-SAR no.
34-401	38623		
34-402	38624		
34-403	38625		
34-404	38626		
34-405	38627		
34-406	38628		
34-407	38629		
34-408	38630		
34-409	38631		
34-410	38632		
34-411	38633		
34-412	38634		
34-413	38635		
34-414	38636		
34-415	38637		
34-416	38638		
34-417	38639		
34-418	38640		
34-419	38641		
34-420	38642		
34-421	38643		
34-422	38644		
34-423	38645		
34-424	38646		
34-425	38647		
34-426	38648	Training aid	34-426
34-427	38649		
34-428	38650		
34-429	38651	Douglas	D10
34-430	38652		
34-431	38653		
34-432	38654		
34-433	38655		
34-434	38656		
34-435	38657		
34-436	38658		
34-437	38659		
34-438	38660		
34-439	38661		
34-440	38662		
34-441	38663		
34-442	38664		
34-443	38665		
34-444	38666		
34-445	38667		
34-446	38668		
34-447	38669		
34-448	38670		
34-449	38671		
34-450	38672		
34-451	38673		
34-452	38674		
34-453	38675		
34-454	38676		
34-455	38677		
34-456	38678		
34-457	38679		
34-458	38680		
34-459	38681		
34-460	38682		
34-461	38683		
34-462	38684		
34-463	38685		
34-464	38686		
34-465	38687		
34-466	38688		
34-467	38689		
34-468	38690		
34-469	38691	KR Lease	9511
34-470	38692	KR Lease	9501
34-471	38693	KR Lease	9502
34-472	38694	KR Lease	9503
34-473	38695	KR Lease	9504
34-474	38696	KR Lease	9505
34-475	38697	KR Lease	9506
34-476	38698	KR Lease	9507
34-477	38699	Sasol	8
34-478	38700	KR Lease	9508
34-479	38701	KR Lease	9509
34-480	38702	KR Lease	9510
34-481	38703		
34-482	38704		
34-483	38705	Sasol	3
34-484	38706		
34-485	38707	Sasol	7
34-486	38708	Sasol	4
34-487	38709		
34-488	38710		
34-489	38711	Sasol	9
34-490	38712	Blue Circle	9
34-491	38713	Blue Circle	8
34-492	38714		
34-493	38715		
34-494	38716		
34-495	38717		
34-496	38718		
34-497	38719		
34-498	38720		
34-499	38721		
34-500	38722		

== Liveries ==
The Class 34-400 were all delivered in the SAR Gulf Red livery with signal red buffer beams, yellow side stripes on the long hood sides and a yellow V on each end. In the 1990s many of the Class 34-400 units began to be repainted in the Spoornet orange livery with a yellow and blue chevron pattern on the buffer beams. At least one later received the Spoornet maroon livery. In the late 1990s many were repainted in the Spoornet blue livery with outline numbers on the long hood sides. After 2008 in the Transnet Freight Rail (TFR) era, many were repainted in the TFR red, green and yellow livery.

== Illustration ==
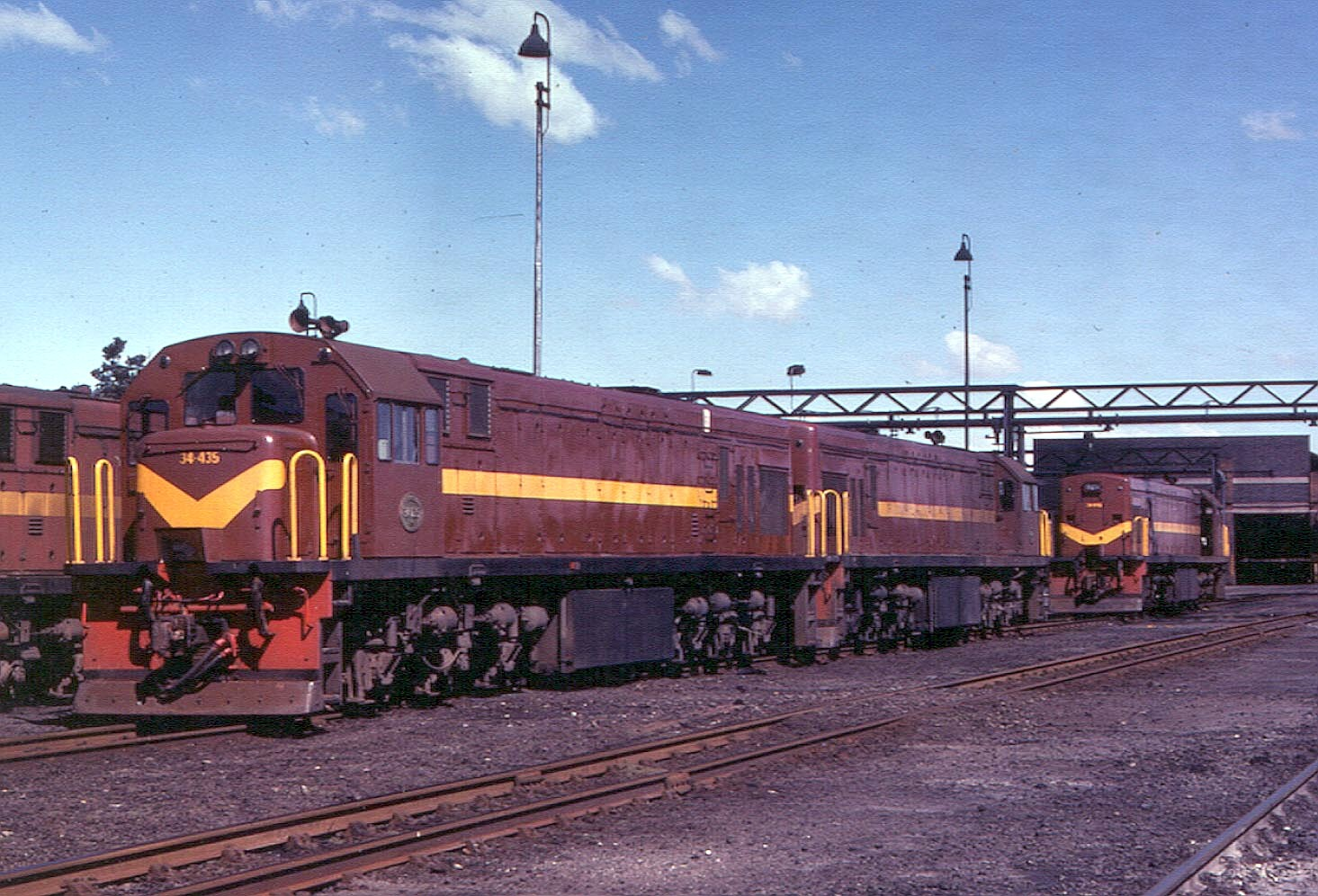
No. 34-435 in SAR Gulf Red and whiskers livery and without saddle filters at Millsite, Krugersdorp, c. March 1982

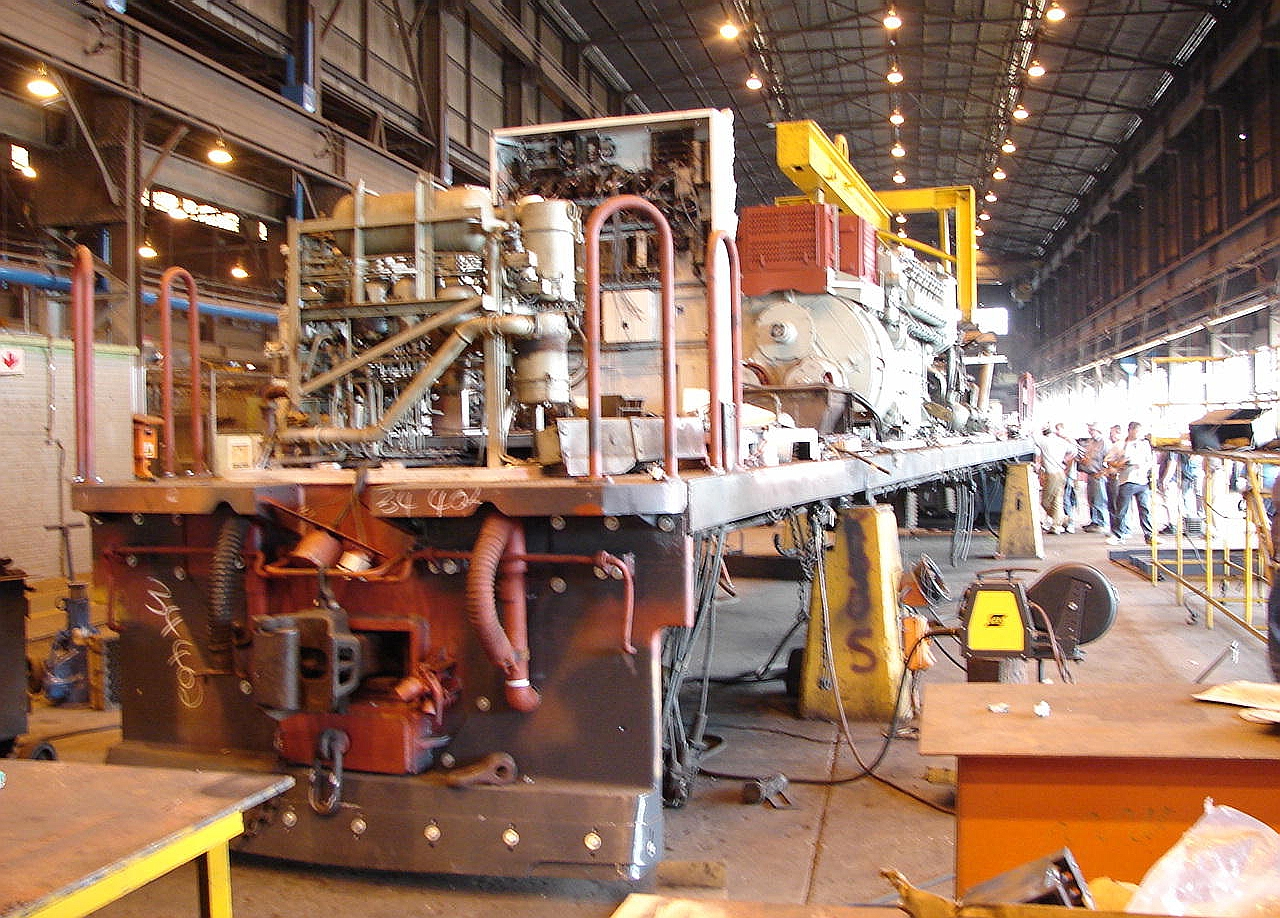
No. 34-402 at the Transwerk shops in Bloemfontein, Free State, undergoing a major overhaul, 7 April 2006

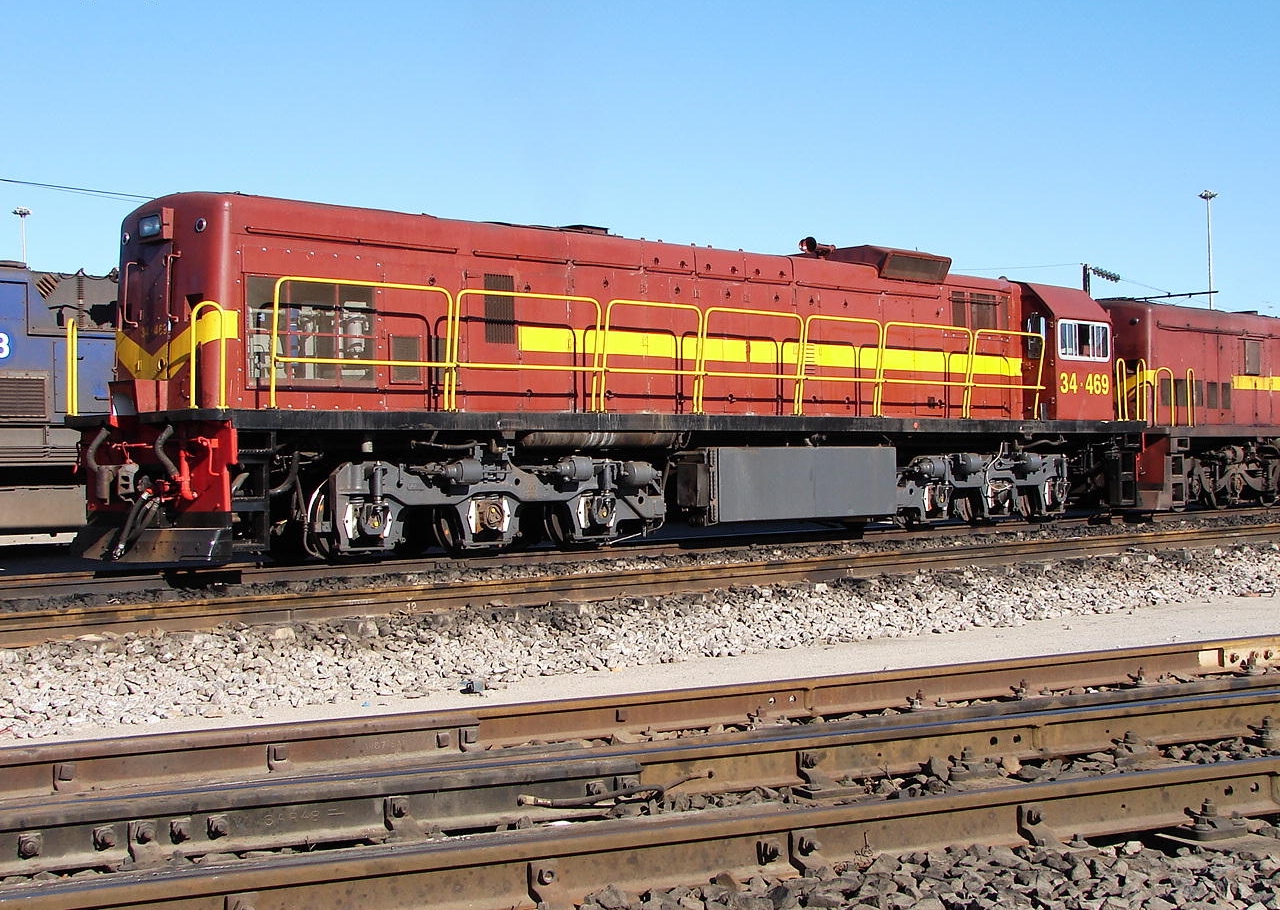
No. 34-469 (ex Kenya Railways no. 9511) at Saldanha, Western Cape, in SAR Gulf Red and whiskers, 19 August 2010

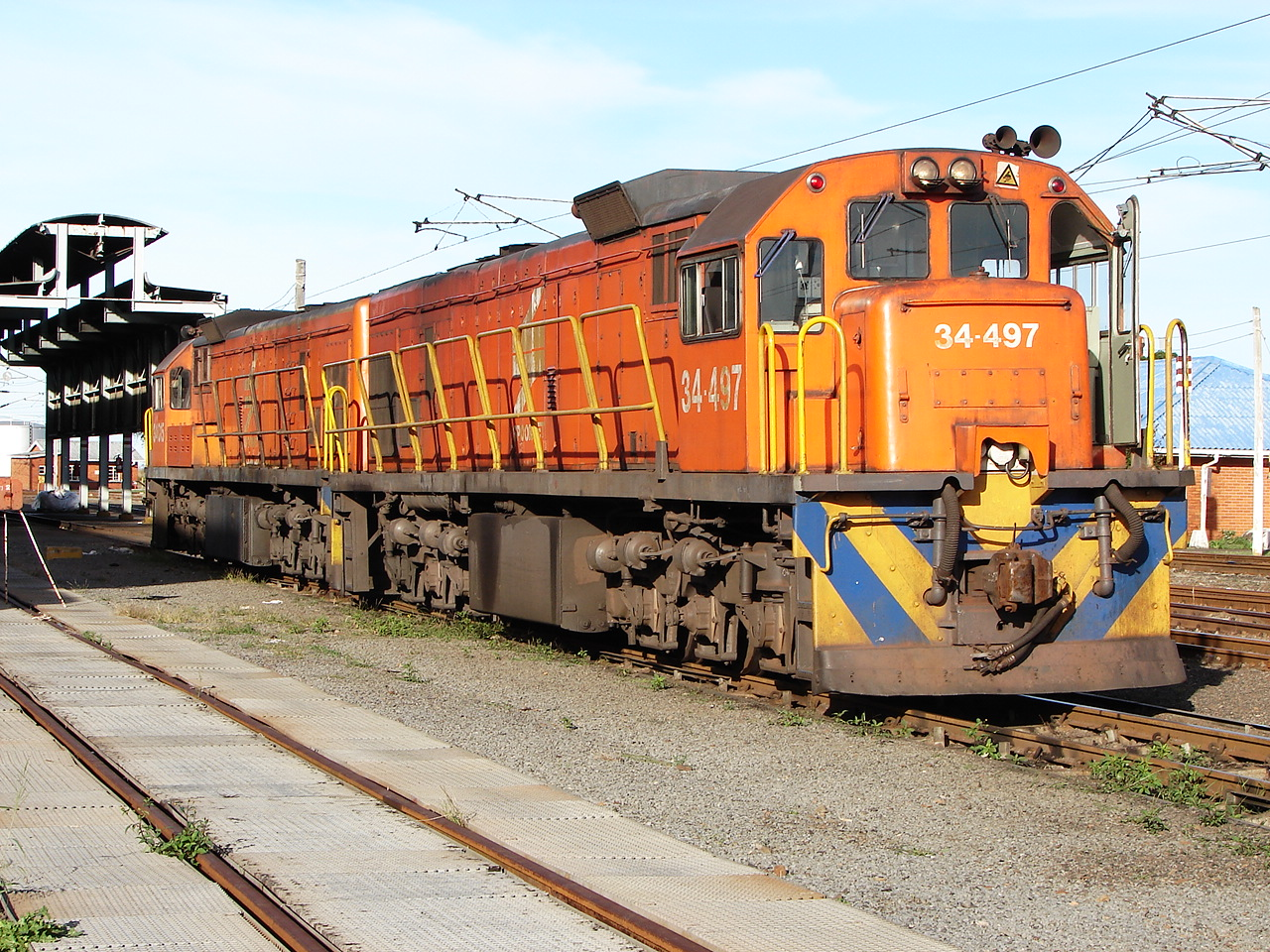
No. 34-497 in Spoornet orange livery at Cambridge loco depot, East London, Eastern Cape, 24 April 2013

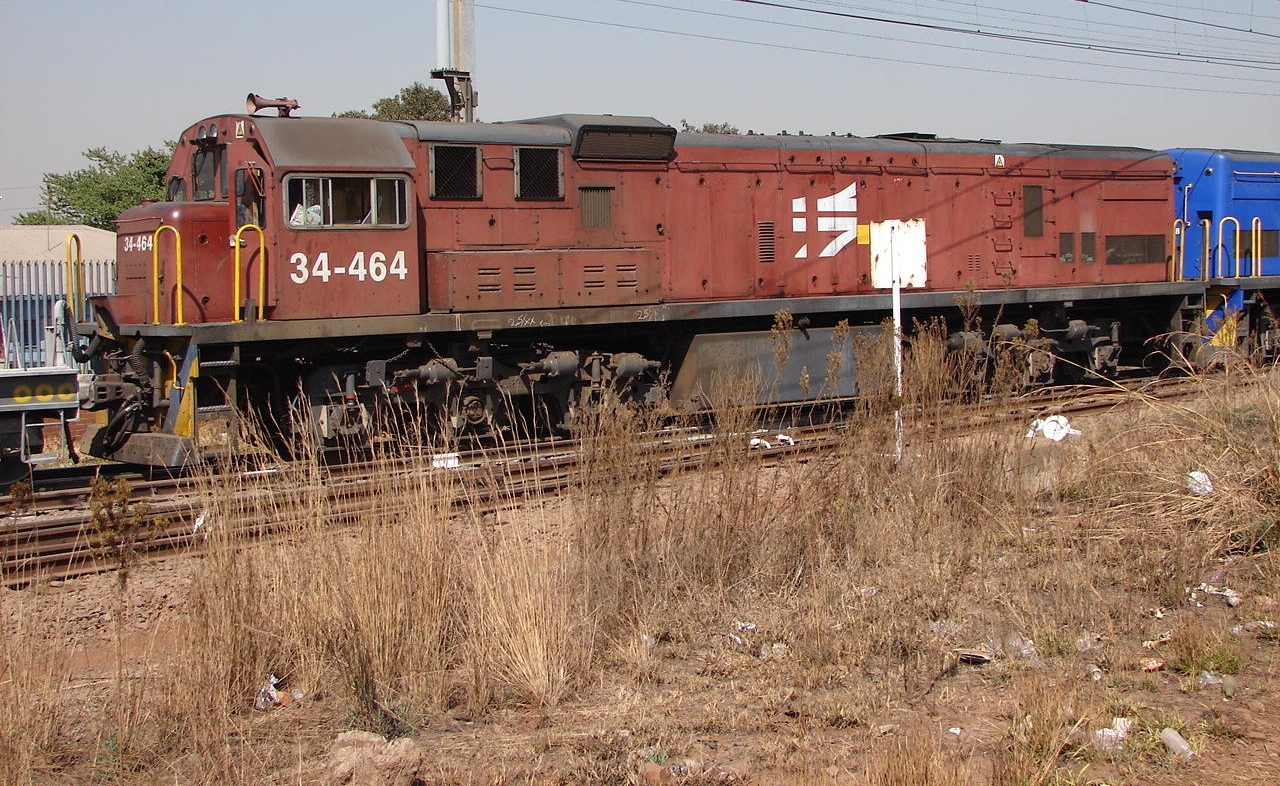
No. 34-464 shunting at the LaFarge Cement siding at Kaalfontein, Kempton Park, Gauteng, in Spoornet maroon livery, 21 August 2007

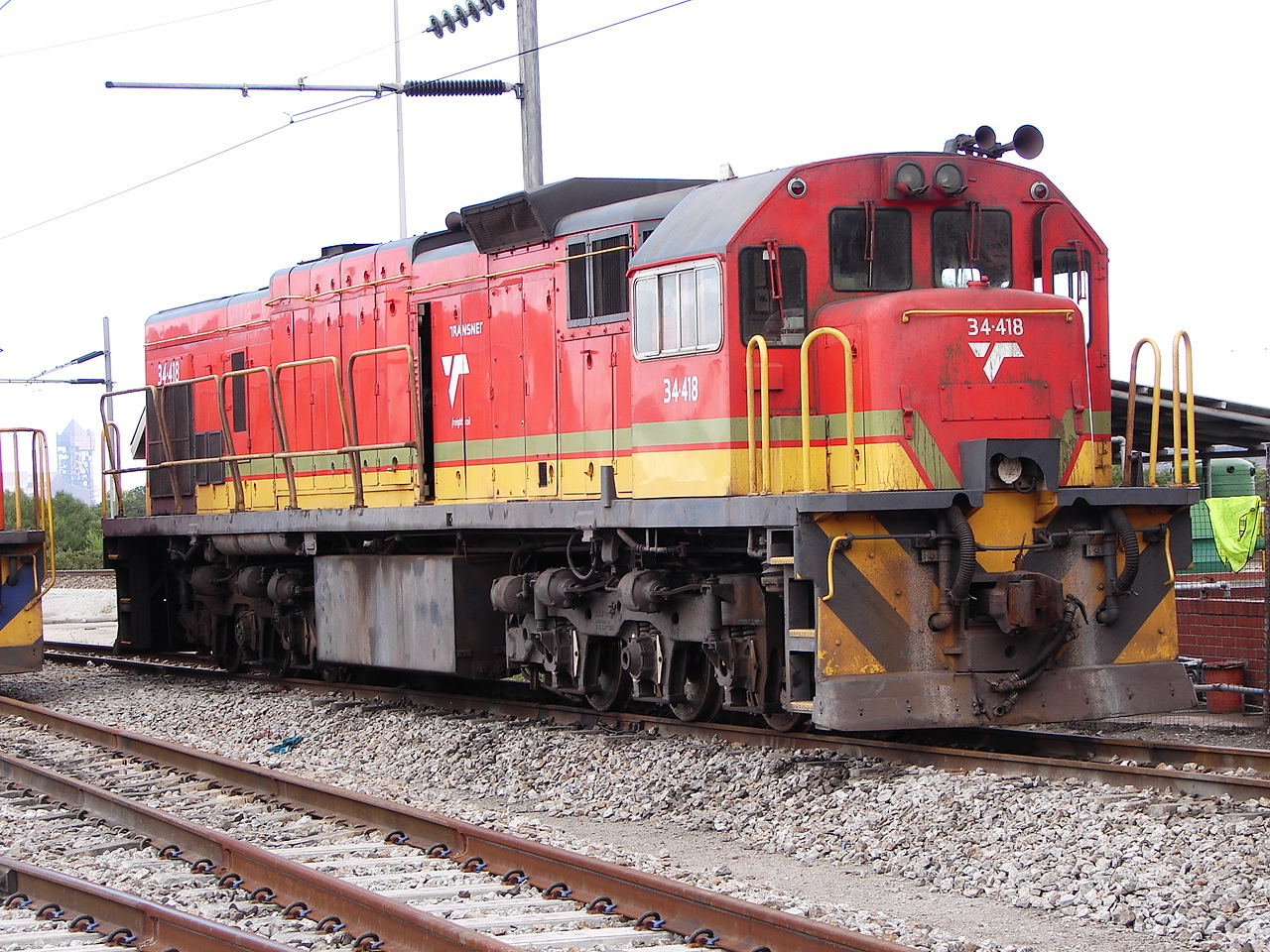
Bright Star equipped no. 34-418 in Transnet Freight Rail livery, Saldanha, 10 February 2013
