= South African Class 43-000 =

Diesel-electric locomotive

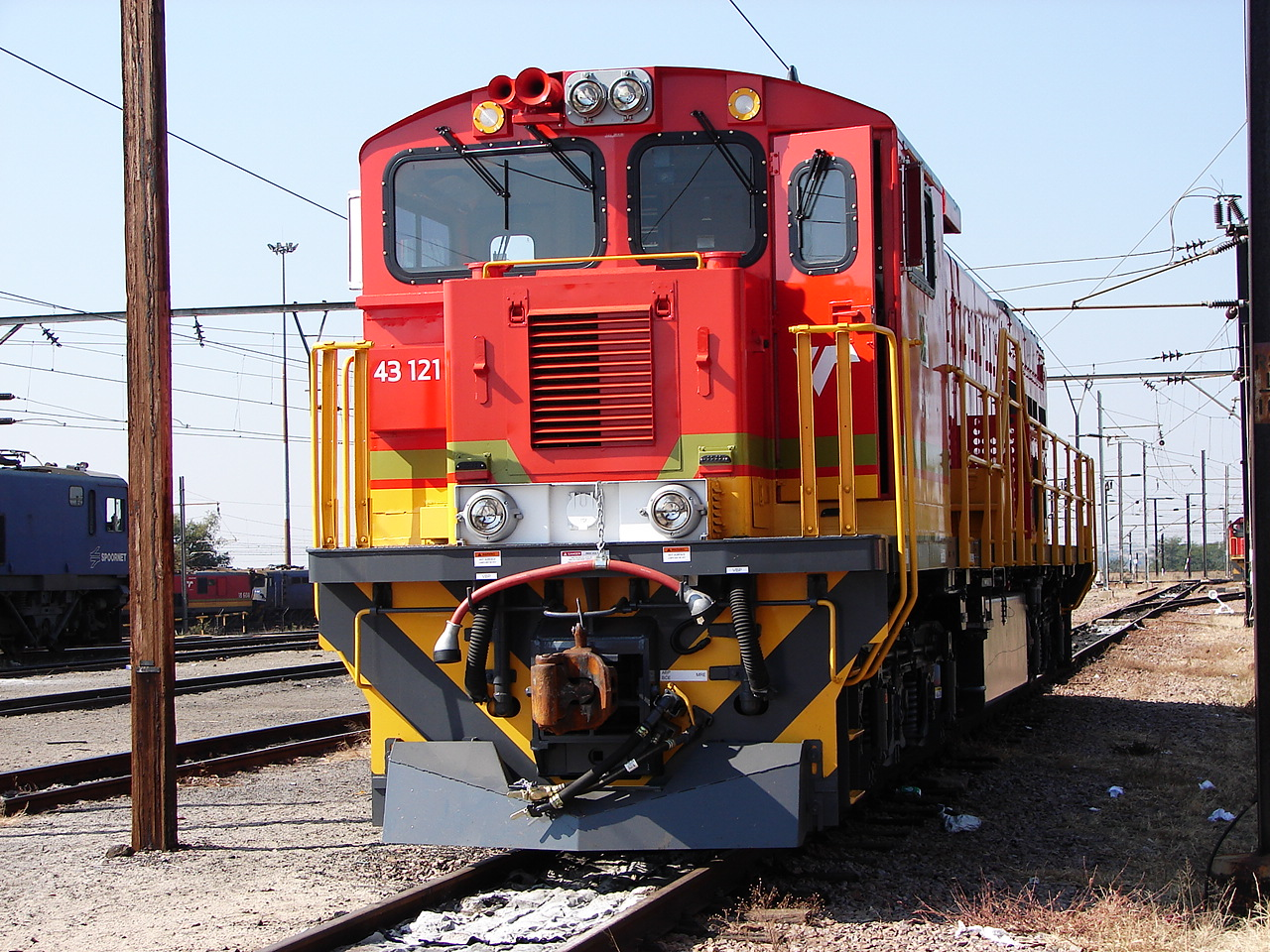
- 43-121 at Pyramid South in May 2013
Type and origin
- Power type: Diesel-electric
- Designer: General Electric
- Builder: General Electric; Transnet Rail Engineering
- Serial number: 58851-58855/2010; 58856-58860/2011
- Model: GE C30ACi
- Build date: 2010–2015
- Total produced: 203 (TFR)
Specifications
- Configuration
  - AAR: C-C
  - UIC: Co'Co'
  - Commonwealth: Co-Co
- Gauge: 3 ft 6 in (1,067 mm) Cape gauge
- Wheel diameter: 1,041 mm (41.0 in) new 965 mm (38.0 in) worn
- Loco weight: 126,000 kg (278,000 lb)
- Fuel type: Diesel
- Fuel capacity: 7,000 litres (1,500 imp gal)
- Prime mover: 12-cylinder 2.2MW FDL12
- Engine type: Diesel engine
- Aspiration: Electronic fuel-injection system
- Traction motors: Six GE 3-phase AC induction
- Loco brake: Air & Dynamic braking
- Train brakes: Air & Vacuum
- Safety systems: Loco-cam
- Couplers: AAR knuckle Type F (Orex Line)
Performance figures
- Maximum speed: 100 km/h (62 mph)
- Power output: 3,300 hp (2,500 kW) GHP; 3,000 hp (2,200 kW) THP
- Tractive effort
  - Starting: 548 kN (123,000 lbf)
  - Continuous: 460 kN (100,000 lbf) @ 14.8 km/h (9.2 mph)
- Dynamic brake peak effort: 288 kN (65,000 lbf)
Career
- Operators: Transnet Freight Rail; Kumba Iron Ore; Caminhos de Ferro de Moçambique
- Class: 43-000
- Number in class: TFR 203, CFM 10, Kumba 6
- Numbers: TFR 43-001 to 43-203; CFM D701 to D710; Kumba F123-0100 to F123-0600
- Delivered: 2011–2013
- First run: 2011

The Transnet Freight Rail Class 43-000 of 2011 is a South African diesel-electric locomotive.

In January 2011, Transnet Rail Engineering at Koedoespoort in Pretoria took delivery of the first two of 203 Class 43-000 General Electric type C30ACi diesel-electric locomotives for Transnet Freight Rail. A further eight were shipped from the United States of America in April 2011. In July 2011, the first of the 209 locally built locomotives for Transnet Freight Rail and two more customers was rolled out at the Koedoespoort shops in Pretoria.

In late 2013, the first locomotives of this Class were also delivered to Kumba Iron Ore at Sishen and Caminhos de Ferro de Moçambique, the Mozambican railways.

== Manufacturers ==
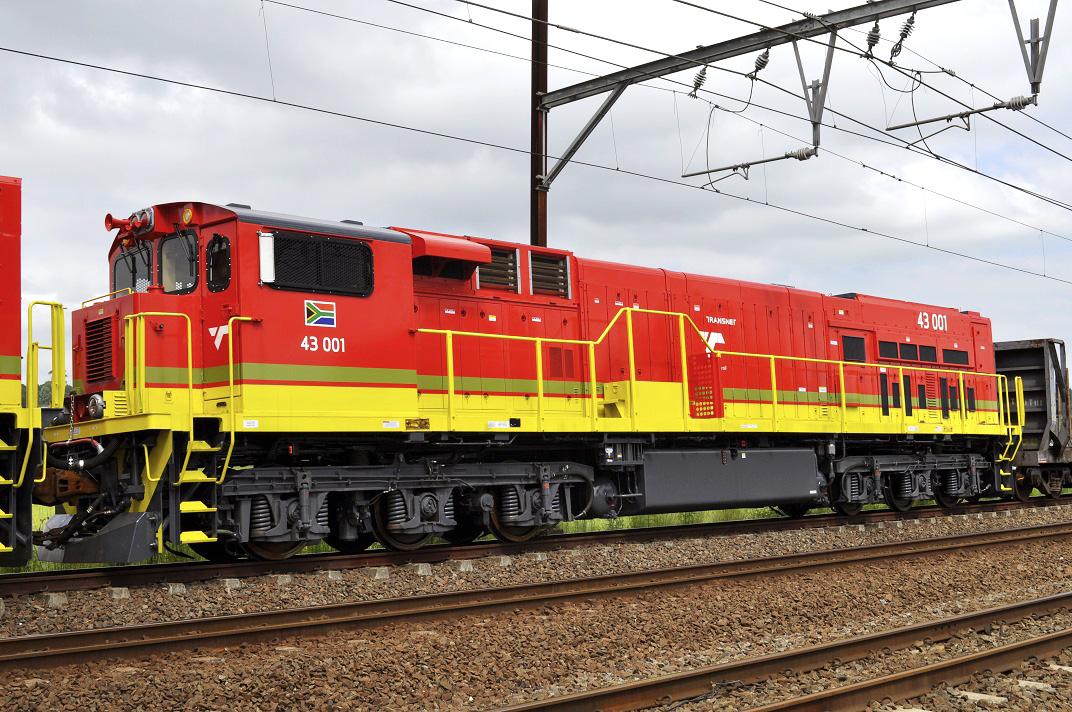
43-001 at Balgowan, KwaZulu-Natal in January 2011

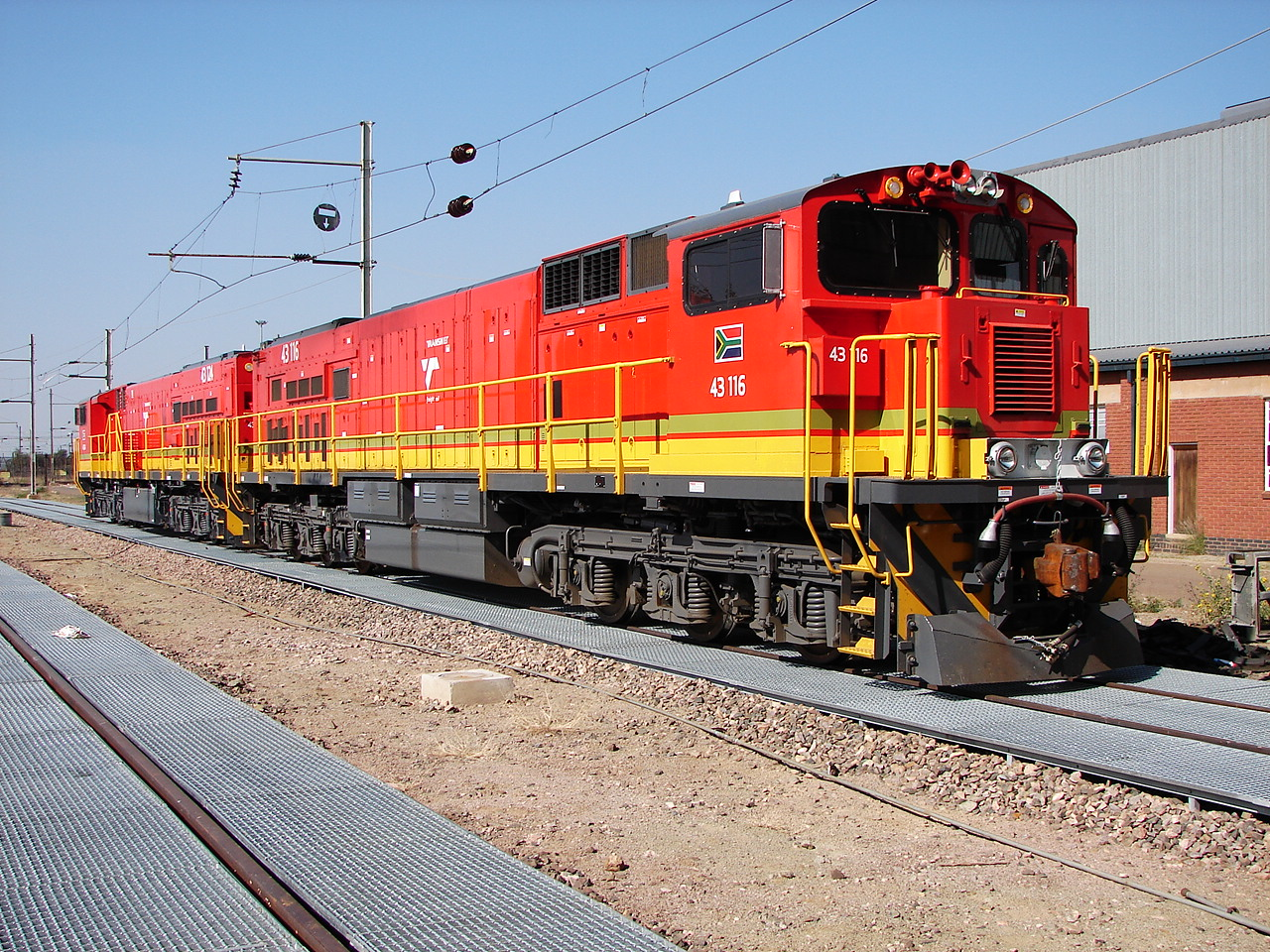
43-116 at Pyramid South in May 2013

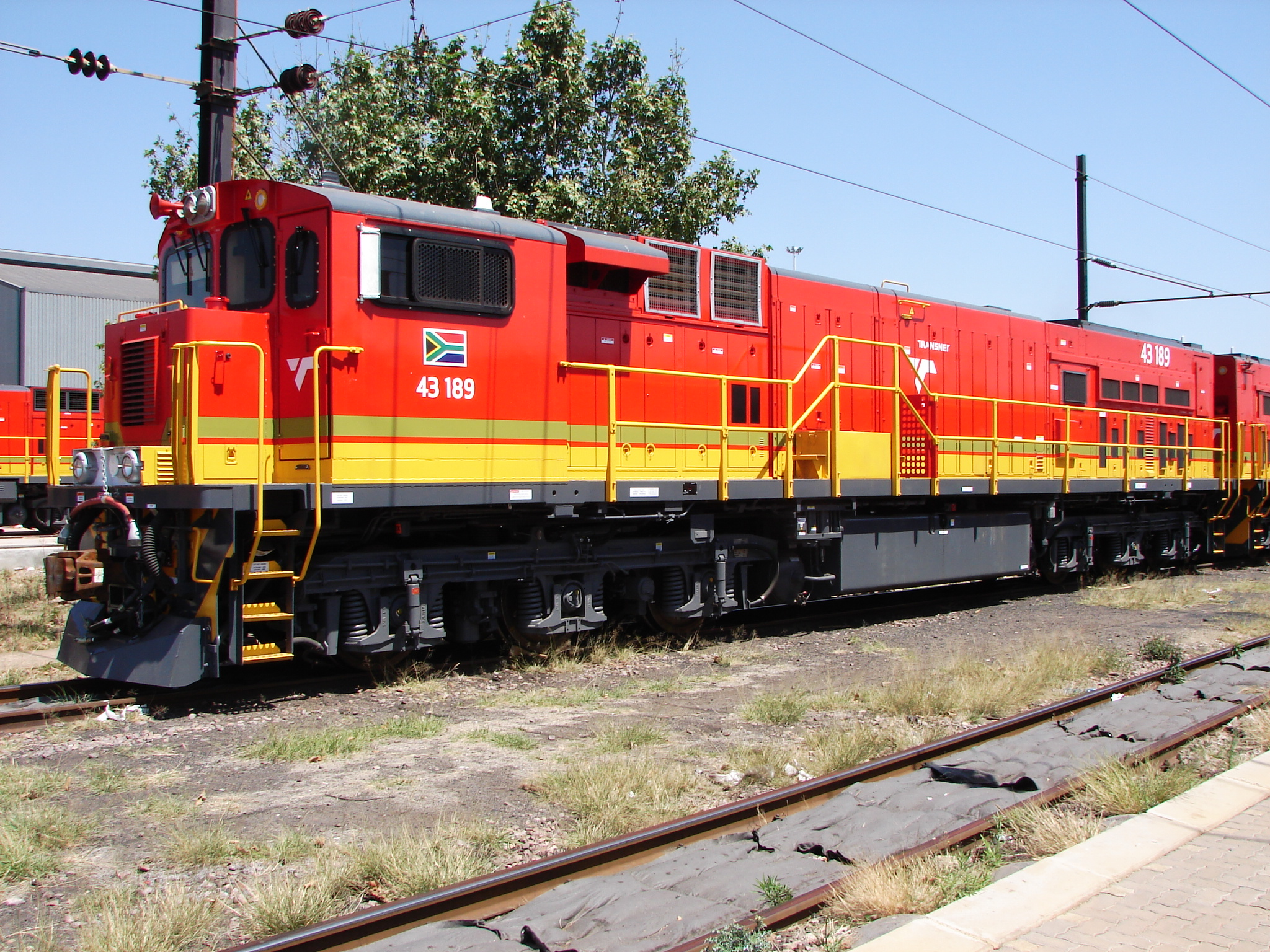
43-189 at Pyramid South on 27 September 2015

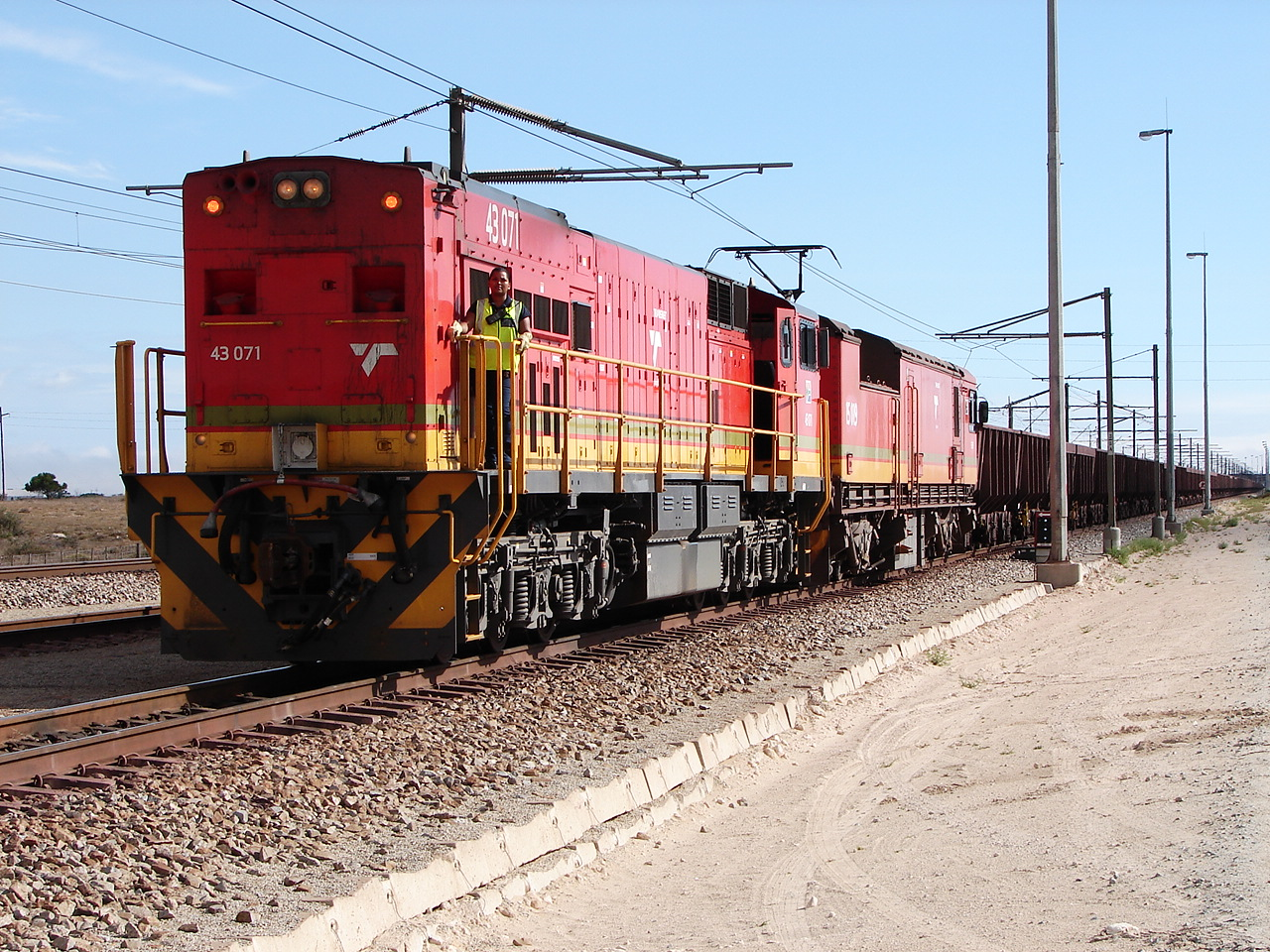
43-071 at the assembly yard, Saldanha in February 2013

=== Tendering process ===
A tendering process in 2006 and 2007 had selected Electro-Motive Sibanye, a joint venture between Electro-Motive Diesel (EMD) and Sibanye Trade and Services, as preferred bidder to supply two hundred and twelve locomotives for Transnet Freight Rail (TFR). Sibanye was a South African Black Economic Empowerment (BEE) front company, dealing with locomotives and spare parts. However, this agreement was cancelled amid reports and then confirmation of tender irregularities.

A new tendering process was initiated, which invited three locomotive manufacturers, EMD, General Electric (GE) and Siemens, to bid for a contract to build 100 diesel-electric locomotives. In 2009, GE was announced as being the successful bidder.

=== Construction ===
The Class 43-000 GE type C30ACi diesel-electric locomotive was designed by GE Transportation, a division of GE. The first ten locomotives were built by GE in Erie, Pennsylvania. They were delivered in January and April 2011 and were numbered in the range from 43-001 to 43-010.

The remainder were built by Transnet Engineering (TE) and GE South African Technologies (GESAT) at the Koedoespoort shops of TE in Pretoria, numbered in the range from 43-011 to 43-100. The first of these, 43-011, was rolled out in July 2011.

At the beginning of 2012, the contract was extended for the construction of a further 43 locomotives, to be numbered in the range from 43-101 to 43-143.

Upon completion of the first two TFR orders, the TE production line at Koedoespoort continued to manufacture C30ACi diesel-electric locomotives for customers elsewhere on the African continent. Since the C30ACi was the latest state-of-the-art GE locomotive specifically designed and built for Cape gauge which is widely used in West and Southern Africa, potential customers may include Ghana, Nigeria, Congo-Brazzaville, Democratic Republic of the Congo, Angola, Mozambique, Malawi, Zambia, Botswana, Namibia, South-western Tanzania and Zimbabwe. The first customers other than TFR were Kumba Iron Ore and Caminhos de Ferro de Moçambique.

In 2014, TFR placed a third order for a further 60 class 43-000 locomotives from TE, to increase its fleet to 203 units.

== Features ==
=== Crew comfort ===
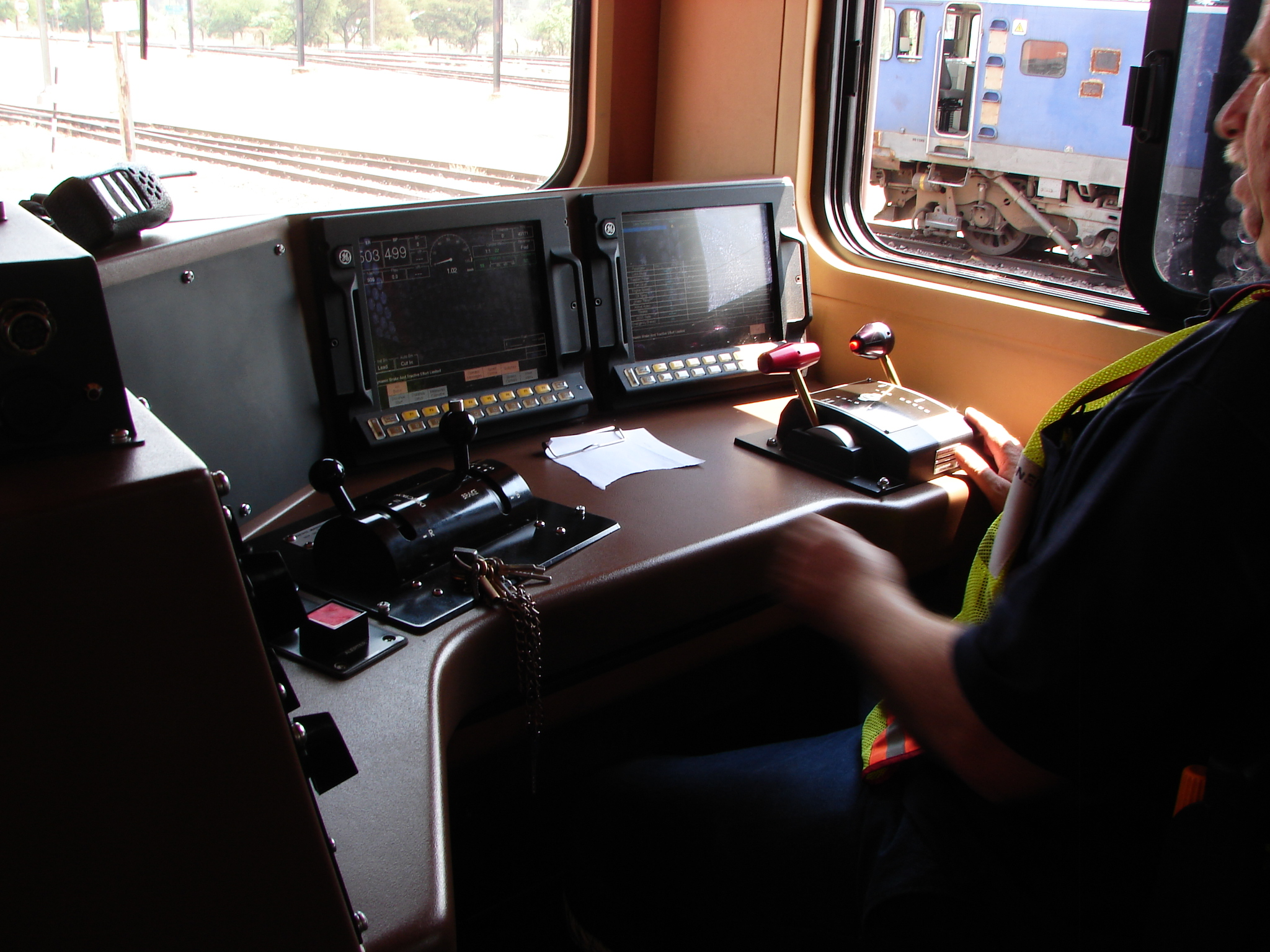
Driver's station of no. 43-171

The locomotives were constructed with both safety and crew comfort in mind. The cab is equipped with a "Loco-cam", an air conditioner, a refrigerator located adjacent to the cab front door, and a toilet in the form of a "Porta Potti" with a floor drain to wayside.

=== Fuel efficiency ===
The GE type C30ACi was the first AC diesel-electric locomotive to be introduced in Sub-Saharan Africa and also the first to meet with the emission standard of the International Union of Railways (Union Internationale des Chemins de fer, UIC). It met with the emission standards for brake-specific nitrogen oxides, unburned hydrocarbons, carbon monoxide and particulate matter. The locomotives were expected to be more fuel-efficient and to produce lower emissions than typical diesel-electric locomotives operating in South Africa until then.

=== Traction and brakes ===
Compared to the, on average, thirty-year-old existing TFR diesel-electric locomotive fleet at the time, the Class 43-000 also offered a greater continuous tractive effort and a higher adhesion capability, allowing the same amount of freight to be hauled with fewer locomotives by replacing four of the older locomotives with three of the new models.

== Service ==
=== Transnet Freight Rail ===
Transnet Freight Rail's Class 43-000 was initially placed in service on the line from the Mpumalanga Lowveld via Swaziland to Richards Bay and, during 2012, also on the Sishen-Saldanha iron ore export (Orex) line. In May 2013, new Class 43-000s were also observed at the Pyramid South locomotive depot north of Pretoria.

=== Kumba Iron Ore ===
In November 2013, six of these C30ACi diesel-electric locomotives, also built at Transnet Engineering's Koedoespoort shops, were delivered to Kumba Iron Ore to be used to shunt iron ore trains at its Sishen mine in the Northern Cape. The locomotives, numbered in the range from F123-0100 to F123-0600, were painted in a dark blue livery with yellow sills and handrails. They replaced ten older locomotives which were hired from Transnet and used in pairs for loading operations. A single C30ACi can be used to load trains of 114 ore wagons each, a task which earlier required two locomotives.

=== Caminhos de Ferro de Moçambique ===
In December 2013, the first four of ten of these C30ACi locomotives were delivered from Transnet Engineering to Caminhos de Ferro de Moçambique, the Mozambican railways, for use on its southern network out of Maputo. The locomotives, numbered in the range from D701 to D710, were acquired to make the railway less dependent on hired locomotives from South Africa and India. The Mozambican locomotives are 9 tonnes lighter than those of TFR, with bogies fabricated by UGL in Australia and different traction motors.

== Mixed power working ==
On the Sishen–Saldanha Orex line, GE Class 34 series and Class 43-000 diesel-electric locomotives run consisted to Class 9E and Class 15E electric locomotives to haul the 342-wagon iron ore trains. Each wagon has a 100-ton capacity and the trains are at least 3.72 kilometres (2.31 miles) in length, powered by mixed consists of Class 9E and Class 15E electric, GE type U26C Classes 34-000, 34-400, 34-500 and 34-900 and from 2012 GE type C30ACi Class 43-000 diesel-electric locomotives. In South Africa mixed electric and diesel-electric consists are unique to the Orex line, necessitated by the huge voltage drops which can occur as a result of the long distance between some of the sub-stations along the route.

A Class 9E or Class 15E electric locomotive serves as the master of each mixed electric and diesel-electric consist, with a total of between eight and twelve locomotives per train, depending on the locomotive types involved and with twelve being the maximum number allowed. Motive power usually consists of three sets of locomotives and a lone electric locomotive pushing at the rear end of the train. Each locomotive set usually consists of one Class 9E or 15E electric and one or two Class 34 or 43-000 diesel-electric locomotives, with each set's electric locomotive controlling its respective diesel-electric companions by means of a Slimkabel (smart cable). In effect, each ore train is therefore made up of three separate 114-wagon trains consisted together, with the locomotives of all three trains and the pusher locomotive at the rear end all controlled by means of a Locotrol radio distributed power control system by one crew in the leading electric locomotive. A typical train would therefore be made up of locomotive set A, 114 wagons, locomotive set B, 114 wagons, locomotive set C, 114 wagons, and the pusher locomotive.
