= South African Class 9E, Series 1 =

Locomotive class

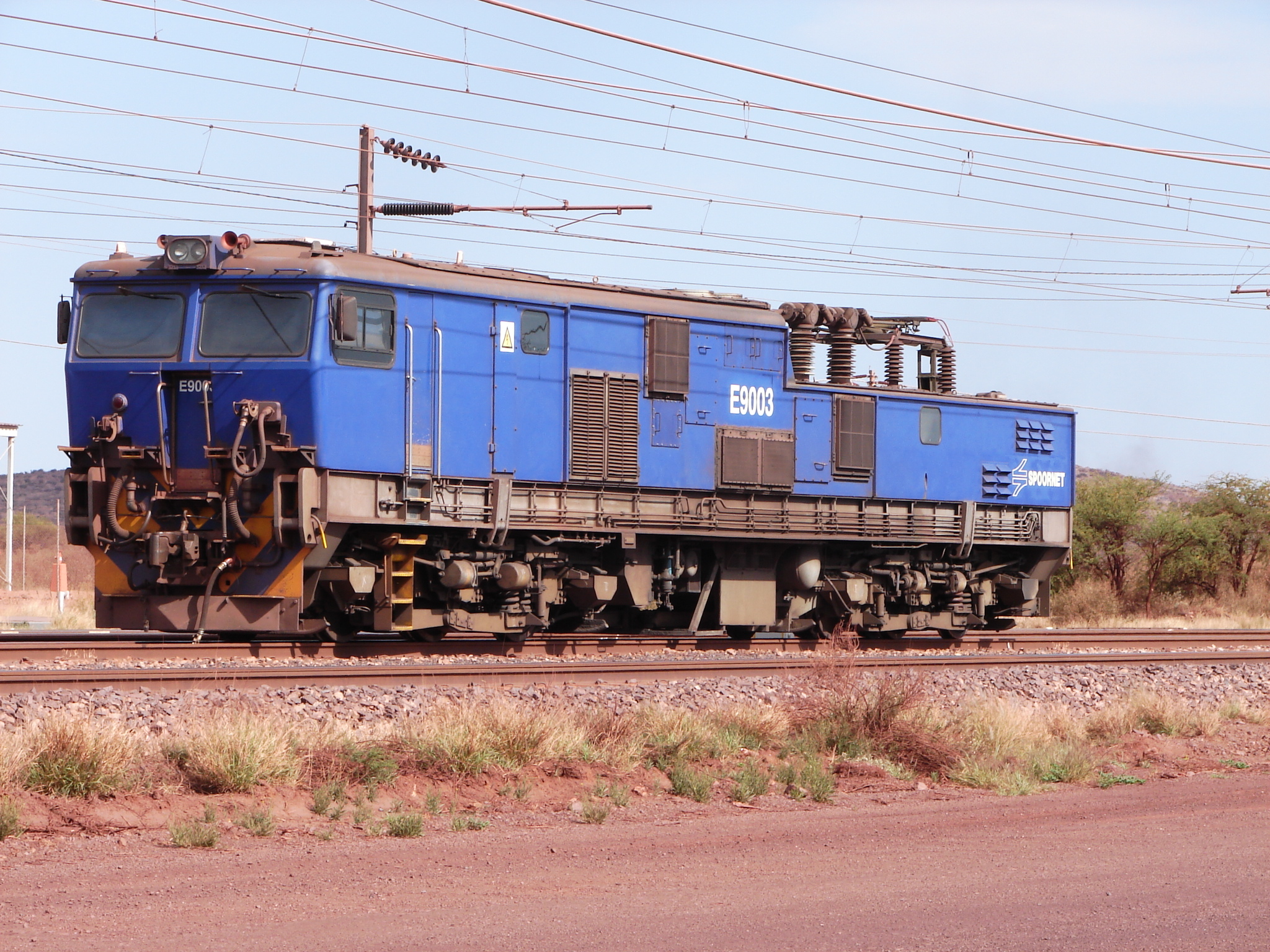
- E9003 at Erts Yard, Kathu, 5 October 2015
Type and origin
- Power type: Electric
- Designer: General Electric Company
- Builder: Union Carriage & Wagon
- Serial number: 5546-5570
- Model: GEC 9E
- Build date: 1978-1979
- Total produced: 25
Specifications
- Configuration
  - AAR: C-C
  - UIC: Co'Co'
  - Commonwealth: Co-Co
- Gauge: 3 ft 6 in (1,067 mm) Cape gauge
- Wheel diameter: 1,220 mm (48.03 in)
- Wheelbase: 16,290 mm (53 ft 5 3/8 in)
  - Bogie: 3,940 mm (12 ft 11 1/8 in)
- Pivot centres: 12,700 mm (41 ft 8 in)
- Length
  - Over couplers: 21,132 mm (69 ft 4 in)
  - Over beams: 20,120 mm (66 ft 1/8 in)
- Width: 2,900 mm (9 ft 6 1/8 in)
- Height
  - Pantograph: 3,900 mm (12 ft 9 1/2 in)
  - Body height: 3,900 mm (12 ft 9 1/2 in)
- Axle load: 28,000 kg (62,000 lb) max
- Adhesive weight: 166,300 kg (366,600 lb)
- Loco weight: 166,300 kg (366,600 lb)
- Electric system/s: 50 kV AC 50 Hz catenary
- Current pickup: Pantograph
- Traction motors: Six G415AZ
  - Rating 1 hour: 690 kW (930 hp)
  - Continuous: 640 kW (860 hp)
- Gear ratio: 18:83
- Loco brake: Air & Rheostatic
- Train brakes: Air & Vacuum, Wabco "Vaporid" air dryer
- Couplers: AAR knuckle
Performance figures
- Maximum speed: 90 km/h (56 mph)
- Power output
  - 1 hour: 4,140 kW (5,550 hp)
  - Continuous: 3,840 kW (5,150 hp)
- Tractive effort
  - Starting: 570 kN (130,000 lbf)
  - 1 hour: 483 kN (109,000 lbf)
  - Continuous: 388 kN (87,000 lbf)
Career
- Operators: South African Railways; Spoornet; Transnet Freight Rail
- Class: Class 9E
- Number in class: 25
- Numbers: E9001-E9025
- Locale: Sishen-Saldanha iron ore line
- Delivered: 1978-1979
- First run: 1978

The South African Railways Class 9E, Series 1 of 1978 is an electric locomotive.

In 1978 and 1979, the South African Railways placed twenty-five 50 kV AC Class 9E, Series 1 electric locomotives with a Co-Co wheel arrangement in service on the Sishen-Saldanha iron ore export line.

== Manufacturer ==
The 50 kV AC Class 9E, Series 1 electric locomotive was designed for the South African Railways (SAR) by the General Electric Company (GEC) and was built by Union Carriage & Wagon (UCW) in Nigel, Transvaal. UCW delivered twenty-five locomotives in 1978 and 1979, numbered in the range from E9001 to E9025.

== Characteristics ==
The locomotive has a single full-width air-conditioned cab. At the rear end, the bodywork is lower to provide clearance for the 50 kV AC electrical equipment which is mounted on the roof. This consists of a single pantograph, a potential divider, a vacuum circuit breaker, a surge diverter and the main transformer’s high-voltage terminal. The electrical control system is solid state, using thyristors.

Since huge voltage drops are often encountered between electric sub-stations, the locomotive was designed to be able to operate on a supply varying between 55 and 25 kV AC. The battery boxes and the main air reservoirs are mounted between the bogies beneath the frame, where a compartment houses a small motor scooter for use by the crew for lineside inspections of the train, which can be up to nearly 4 kilometres (2.5 miles) long.

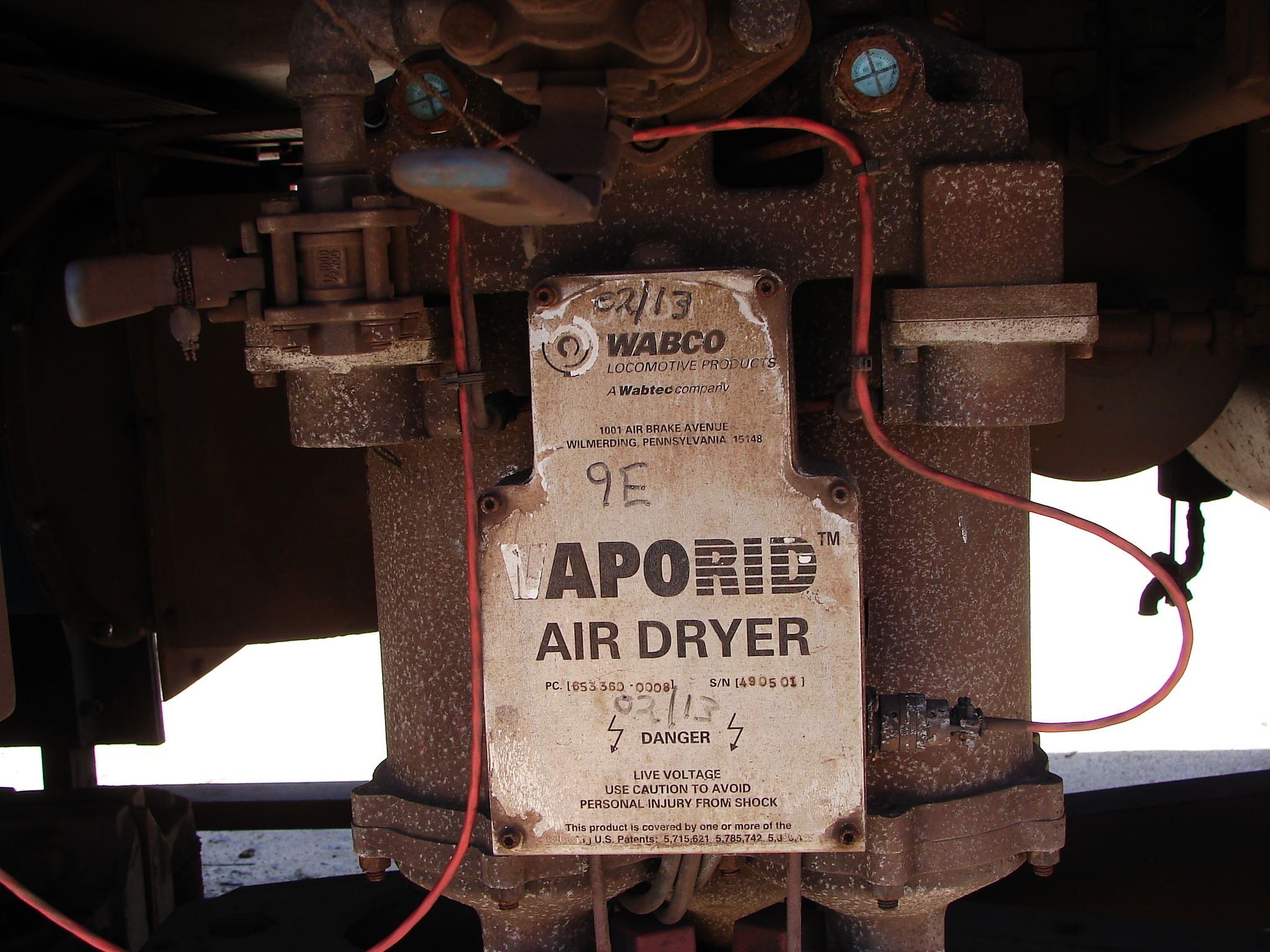
Wabco brake air dryer on E9024

Series 1 locomotives have four braking systems, air brakes for the locomotive, train air braking, a handbrake and dynamic rheostatic braking which can dissipate 4,200 kilowatts (5,600 horsepower).

By 2007, the entire fleet of both series of Class 9E electric locomotives were upgraded with Alstom's Agate train control and communication technology. The pantographs on most of these locomotives were also replaced by the single arm type.

The Series 1 and Series 2 Class 9Es can be visually distinguished from each other by their bogies, which were redesigned for the Series 2 locomotives.

== Service ==
Class 9E locomotives are used on the 861-kilometre-long (535-mile) Sishen-Saldanha iron ore line to haul export ore from the open cast iron mines at Sishen in the Northern Cape to the harbour at Saldanha in the Western Cape. Most of the route is across the hot and dry Northern Cape, but the last 75 kilometres (47 miles) to Saldanha runs parallel to the Atlantic coastline and is subjected to the fog and salt sea air of the West Coast.

In South Africa, the Sishen-Saldanha line is unusual for several reasons.

- Construction, which began in 1973, was not undertaken by the SAR, but by the South African Iron and Steel Corporation (ISCOR), who operated the line with diesel-electric motive power. Operations on the Sishen-Saldanha iron ore line was only taken over from ISCOR by the SAR in 1977.
- It was electrified by the SAR at 50 kV AC, compared to the 25 kV AC high voltage which was used in other parts of the country.
- At the time, it was the longest 50 kV AC electrified railway line in the world.
- It is the only line in South Africa where electric and diesel-electric locomotives are consisted in mixed power use.

== Mixed power ==
On the Sishen–Saldanha Orex line, General Electric (GE) Classes 34 series and 43-000 diesel-electric locomotives run consisted to Classes 9E and 15E electric locomotives to haul the 342 gondola iron ore trains. Each gondola has a 100-ton capacity and the trains are at least 3.72 kilometres (2.31 miles) in length, powered by mixed consists of Classes 9E and 15E electric and GE type U26C Classes 34-000, 34-400, 34-500 and 34-900 and GE type C30ACi Class 43-000 diesel-electric locomotives.

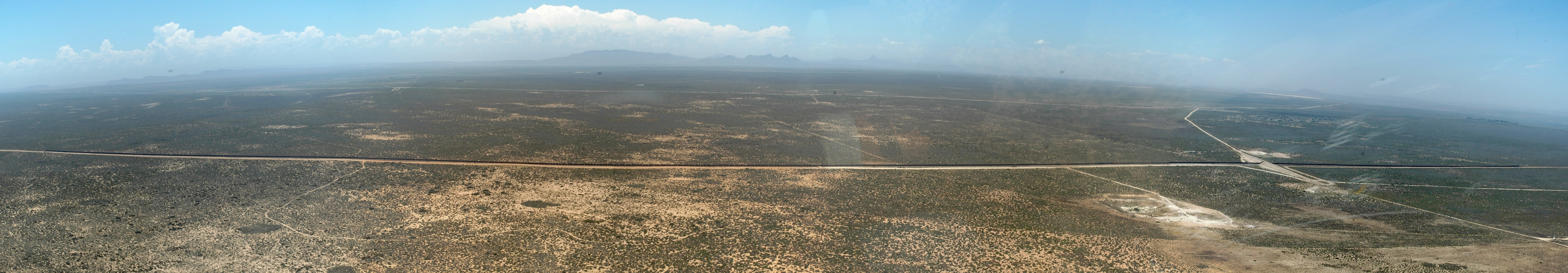
Ore train about 100 kilometres (62 miles) north of Lamberts Bay

A Class 9E or Class 15E electric locomotive serves as the master of each mixed electric and diesel-electric consist, with a total of between nine and twelve locomotives per train, twelve being the maximum number allowed. Before the Class 15E was placed in service in 2010, motive power usually consisted of three sets of locomotives, each set made up of one or two Class 9E electrics and one or two Class 34 diesel-electrics, with each set’s leading electric locomotive controlling its respective set of diesel-electrics by means of a slimkabel (smart cable). In effect, each ore train was made up of three separate 114 gondola trains consisted together, with the locomotives of all three trains controlled by means of a Locotrol radio distributed power control system by one crew in the leading electric locomotive. A typical train would therefore be made up of locomotive set A, 114 trucks, locomotive set B, 114 gondolas, locomotive set C, and 114 gondolas.

Some problems were experienced using this configuration and after a couple of major derailments, the locomotive configuration was changed to four sets, with locomotive set D initially made up of two Class 34 diesel-electric locomotives at the rear end of the train, pushing at between 40% and 50% of tractive power at all times, depending on the grades being traversed. The total maximum number allowed was still between nine and twelve locomotives per train.

As more Class 15Es were delivered and placed in service, Class 9E or Class 15E electrics replaced the pair of Class 34 diesel-electrics in set D. At the same time, the more powerful Classes 15E electric and 43-000 diesel-electric locomotives also made it possible to use as few as seven locomotives per train, with locomotive sets A, B and C each made up of one Class 15E or 9E and one Class 34 or 43-000, and set D of a single Class 9E or 15E.

== Liveries ==
The whole series was delivered in the SAR Gulf Red livery with signal red cowcatchers, yellow whiskers and with the number plates on the sides mounted on three-stripe yellow wings. In the 1990s some of the units began to be repainted in the Spoornet orange livery with a yellow and blue chevron pattern on the cowcatchers. In the late 1990s many were repainted in the Spoornet blue livery with either solid or outline numbers on the sides.

== Illustration ==
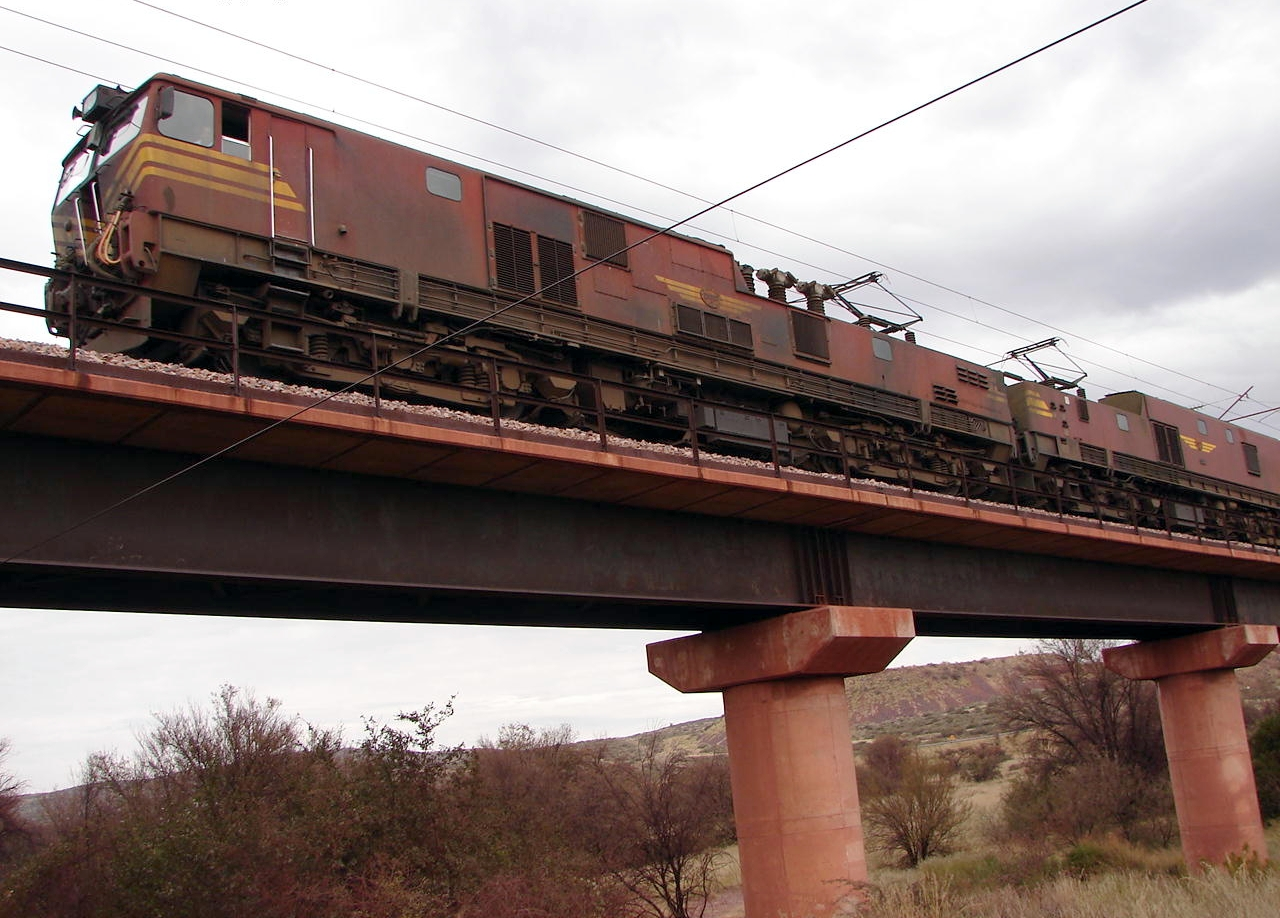
No. E9006 in SAR Gulf Red livery near Dingleton, Northern Cape, 14 May 2006

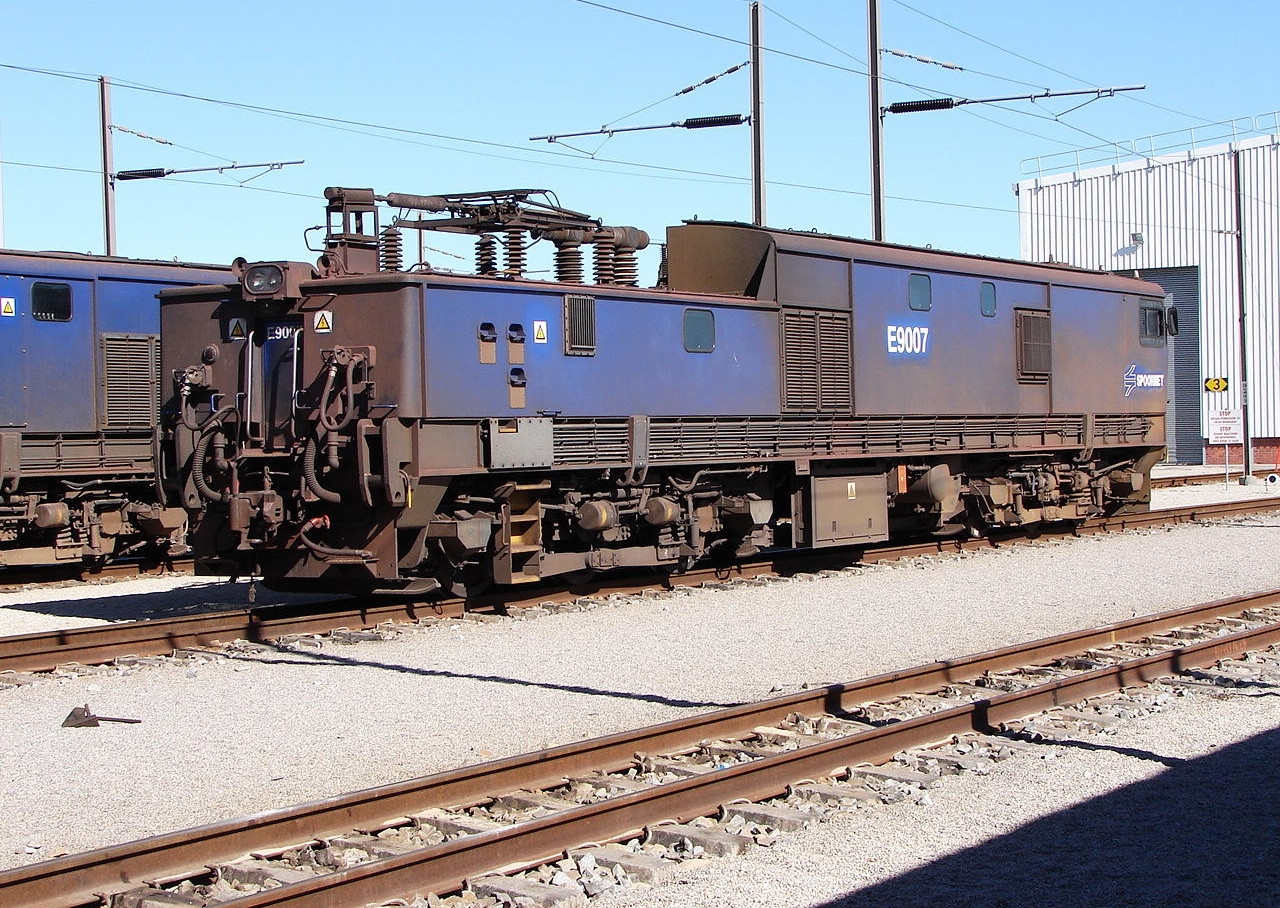
Rear end view of no. E9007, Salkor yard, Saldanha, 19 August 2010

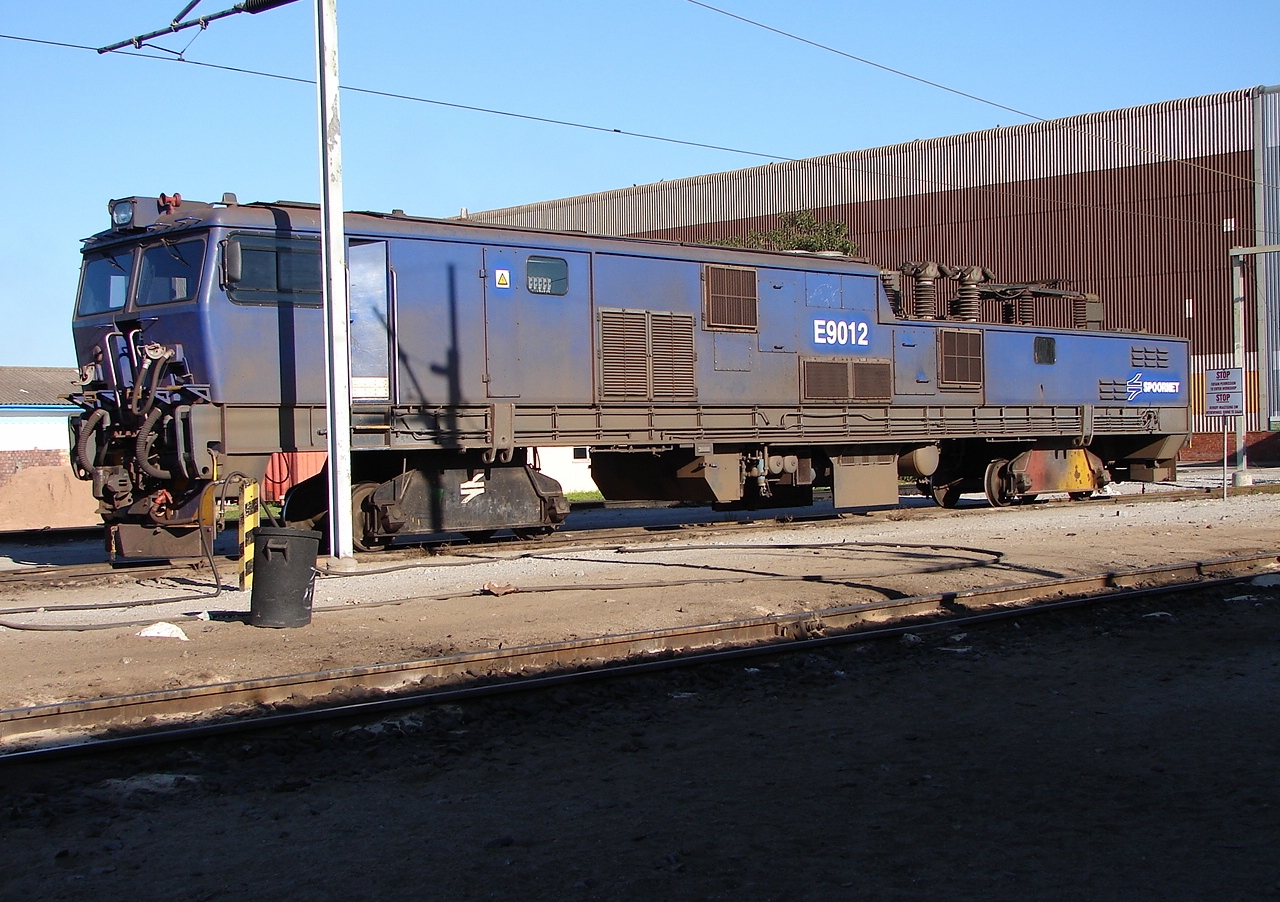
No. E9012 on workshop bogies during servicing, Saldanha, 26 July 2009
