= South African Class 15E =

Type of electric locomotive

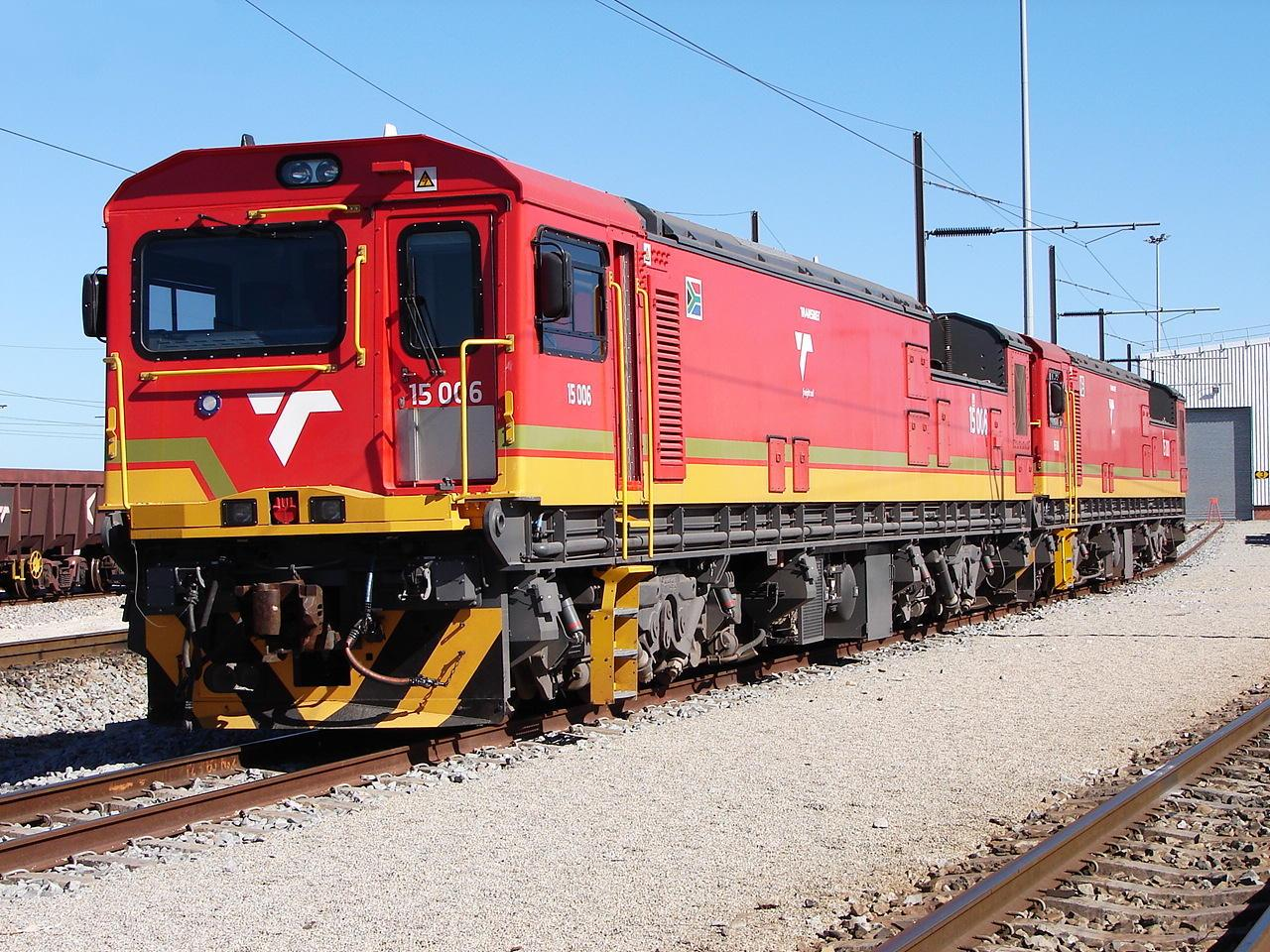
- Numbers 15-006 and 15-001 at the Salkor Depot, Saldanha, 19 August 2010
Type and origin
- Power type: Electric
- Designer: Mitsui
- Builder: Union Carriage & Wagon
- Build date: 2009-2013
- Total produced: 76
Specifications
- Configuration
  - AAR: C-C
  - UIC: Co'Co'
  - Commonwealth: Co-Co
- Gauge: 3 ft 6 in (1,067 mm) Cape gauge
- Wheel diameter: 1,220 mm (48.03 in) new 1,136 mm (44.72 in) worn
- Wheelbase: Unknown
  - Bogie: 2,100 mm (6 ft 10.7 in)
- Length
  - Over couplers: 21,378 mm (70 ft 1.7 in)
- Width: 2,920 mm (9 ft 7.0 in)
- Height
  - Pantograph: 3,885 mm (12 ft 9.0 in)
  - Body height: 3,885 mm (12 ft 9.0 in)
- Axle load: 30,000 kg (66,000 lb)
- Loco weight: 180,000 kg (400,000 lb) max
- Electric system/s: 50 kV AC 50 Hz (27.5-55 kV); Controls: 110 V DC (77-121 V) catenary
- Current pickup(s): Pantograph
- Traction motors: Six Toshiba AC
- Loco brake: Air, Regenerative and Rheostatic
- Train brakes: Air
- Couplers: AAR knuckle Type F (Tightlock coupling)
Performance figures
- Maximum speed: 90 km/h (56 mph)
- Power output: 4,500 kW (6,000 hp)
- Tractive effort
  - Starting: 588 kN (132,000 lbf)
  - Continuous: 454 kN (102,000 lbf)
- Factor of adh.
  - Starting: 33.5%
  - Continuous: 25.7% @ 35 km/h (22 mph)
- Brakeforce: 413 kN (93,000 lbf), 23.5% adh. @ 5 to 45 km/h (3.1 to 28.0 mph)
Career
- Operators: Transnet Freight Rail
- Class: 15E
- Number in class: 76
- Numbers: 15-001 to 15-076
- Delivered: 2010-2013
- First run: 2010

The Transnet Freight Rail Class 15E of 2010 is a South African electric locomotive.

In 2010, Transnet Freight Rail placed the first of seventy-six Class 15E heavy electric freight locomotives with a Co-Co wheel arrangement in service on the Sishen–Saldanha iron ore export line.

== Manufacturers ==
The 50 kV AC 50 Hz Class 15E is the product of a joint venture by Mitsui who was responsible for the design, Toshiba who supplied the electrical components, the RSD division of DCD-Dorbyl who supplied the monoblock cast frame, bolster bogies and drawgear, and Union Carriage & Wagon (UCW) in Nigel who constructed the bodies. It was manufactured for Transnet Freight Rail (TFR) by UCW who delivered the first locomotives in 2010.

These heavy duty electric locomotives use Toshiba-made 3-phase AC motors, powered through insulated-gate bipolar transistor (IGBT) control. They are single-cab locomotives, a feature they share with the Class 19E electric locomotives of the Coalink Line, also made with Toshiba technology, the Class 9E Series 1 and 2 electric locomotives of the Orex Line, and electric locomotives of Classes 7E1, 7E4, 11E, 18E, 20E, 21E and 22E.

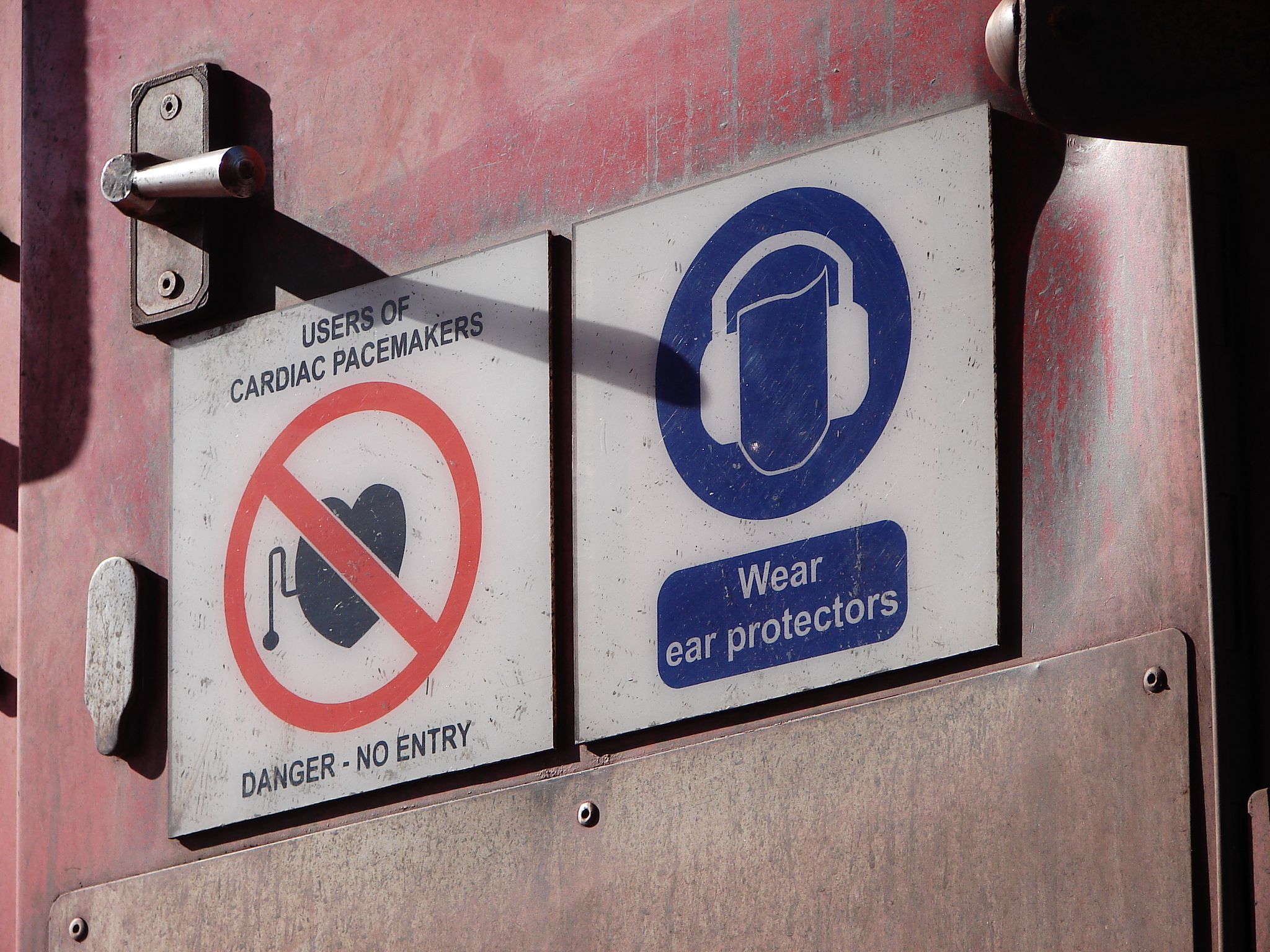
Safety signs on Class 15E rear door

The initial order was for forty-four locomotives, of which the last were delivered by UCW and accepted by TFR in the first week of August 2011. On 2 March 2011, it was announced in a Transnet press release that, in line with Transnet's target of achieving 61 million tons per annum on the Orex line, Transnet had signed an agreement with Venus Railway Solutions, a subsidiary of Japan's Mitsui, and local BEE investors for the supply of an additional thirty-two Class 15E locomotives. Production of these additional locomotives commenced in December 2011, with the first unit delivered by May 2012 and the last by August 2013.

== Service ==
Class 15E locomotives are used exclusively on the 861-kilometre-long (535-mile) Orex line to haul export ore from the open cast iron mines near Sishen in the Northern Cape to the harbour at Saldanha Bay in the Western Cape. Most of the route is across the hot and dry Northern Cape, but the last 160 kilometres (99 miles) to Saldanha runs parallel to the Atlantic coastline and is subjected to the fog and salt sea air of the West Coast.

In South Africa, the Orex line is unusual for several reasons.

- Construction, which began in 1973, was not undertaken by the South African Railways (SAR), but by the South African Iron and Steel Corporation (ISCOR), who operated the line with diesel-electric motive power. Operations on the Orex line was only taken over by the SAR in 1977.
- It was electrified by the SAR at 50 kV AC, compared to the 25 kV AC high voltage which it used in other parts of the country.
- At the time, it was the longest 50 kV AC electrified railway line in the world.
- It is the only line in South Africa where electric and diesel-electric locomotives are consisted in mixed power use.

== Mixed power ==
On the Orex line, General Electric (GE) diesel-electric locomotives run consisted to General Electric Company (GEC) Class 9E and Mitsui Class 15E electric locomotives to haul the 342-truck iron ore trains. Each truck has a 100-ton capacity and the trains are at least 3.72 kilometres (2.31 miles) in length, powered by mixed consists of Classes 9E and 15E electric, GE type U26C Class 34-000, 34-400, 34-500, 34-900 and GE type C30ACi Class 43-000 diesel-electric locomotives.

The use of mixed electric and diesel-electric power is necessitated by the huge voltage drops which can occur as a result of the long distance between some of the sub-stations along the route, with a supply voltage which can vary between 55 and 25 kV AC and with the lower value voltage sometimes occurring between sub-stations. Electric-only trains would therefore reduce the maximum possible traffic frequency.

A Class 9E or Class 15E electric locomotive serves as the master of each mixed electric and diesel-electric consist, with a total of between nine and twelve locomotives per train, twelve being the maximum number allowed. Before the Class 15E was placed in service in 2010, motive power usually consisted of three sets of locomotives, each set made up of one or two Class 9E electrics and one or two Class 34 diesel-electrics, with each set's leading electric locomotive controlling its respective set of diesel-electrics by means of a slimkabel (smart cable). In effect, each ore train is made up of three separate 114-truck trains consisted together, with the locomotives of all three trains controlled by means of a Locotrol radio distributed power control system by one crew in the leading electric locomotive. A typical train would therefore be made up of locomotive set A, 114 trucks, locomotive set B, 114 trucks, locomotive set C, and 114 trucks.

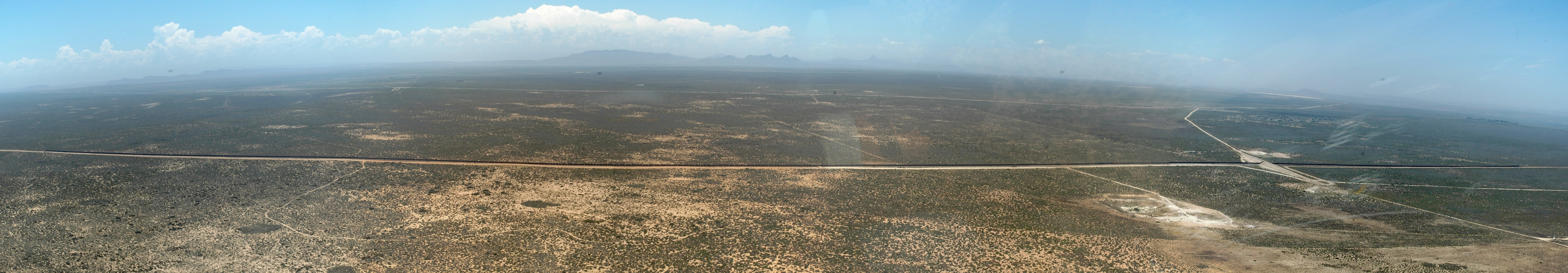
Ore train about 100 kilometres (62 miles) north of Lamberts Bay (Scroll the bar above from left to right to see the full train's length)

Some problems were experienced using this configuration and after a couple of major derailments, the locomotive configuration was changed to four sets, with locomotive set D initially made up of two Class 34 diesel-electric locomotives at the rear end of the train, pushing at between 40% and 50% of tractive power at all times depending on the grades being traversed. The total maximum number allowed was still between nine and twelve locomotives per train.

As more Class 15Es were delivered and placed in service and with the arrival of the GE type C30ACi Class 43-000 diesel-electrics from 2011, a single Class 9E or 15E electric replaced the pair of Class 34 diesel-electrics in set D. At the same time, the more powerful Class 15E and Class 43-000 also made it possible to use as few as seven locomotives per train, with locomotive sets A, B and C each made up of one Class 15E and one Class 34 or Class 43-000, and set D of a single Class 9E or 15E.

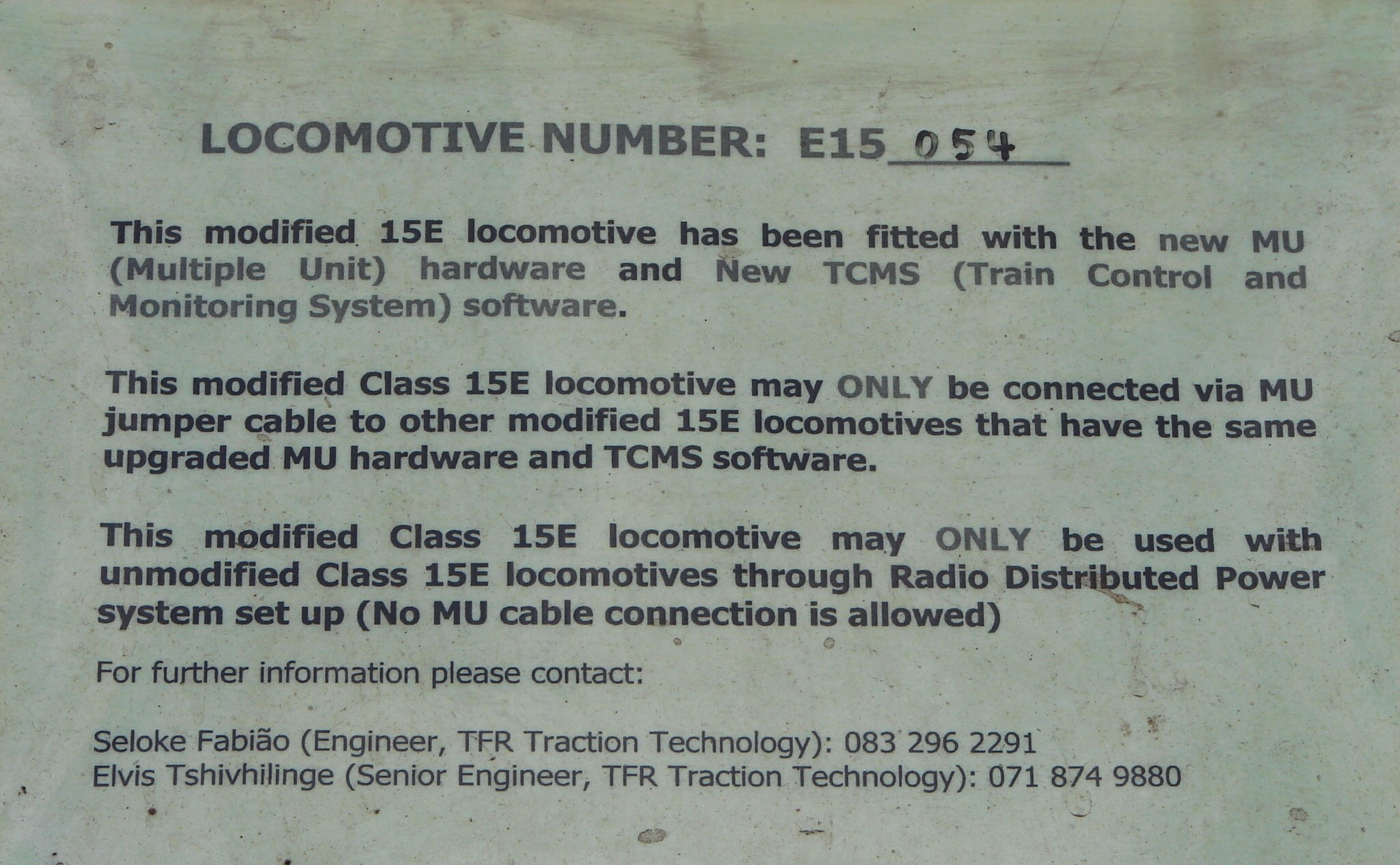
Notice on front door of modified unit no. 15-054, 5 October 2015

== Modification ==
During 2015, the Class 15E fleet began to be equipped with new multiple unit (MU) hardware and train control and monitoring system (TCMS) software. Modified locomotives carried temporary plaques on their front doors to indicate that the modification had been carried out and to warn train crews that the locomotive may not be connected to an unmodified locomotive by multiple unit jumper cable. Modified locomotives could only be used with unmodified locomotives through the radio distributed power system.

== Illustration ==
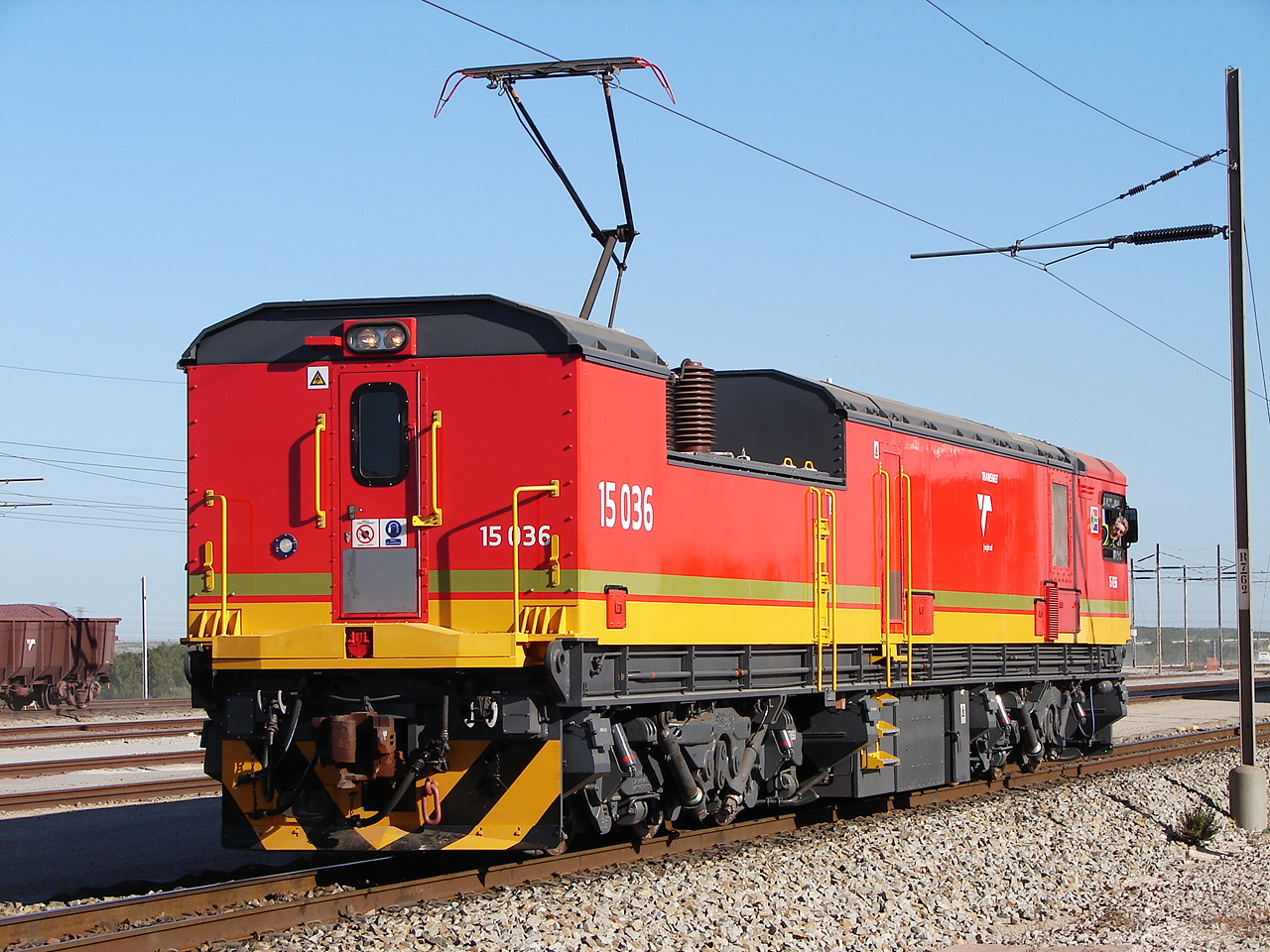
No. 15-036 in the Salkor Yard, Saldanha, 14 July 2011

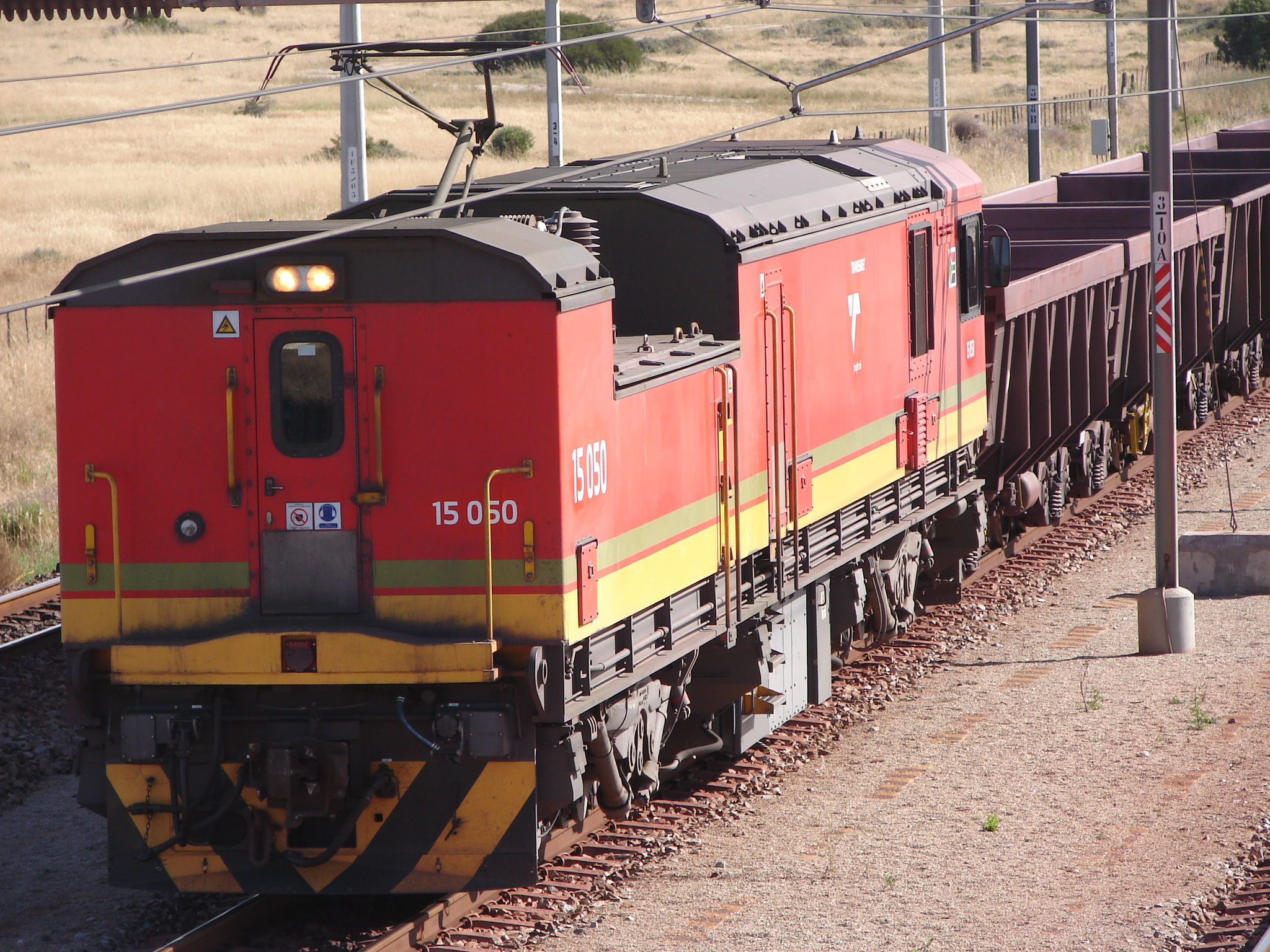
No. 15-050 taking its Set B train section to the Salkor train assembly yard, 11 November 2014

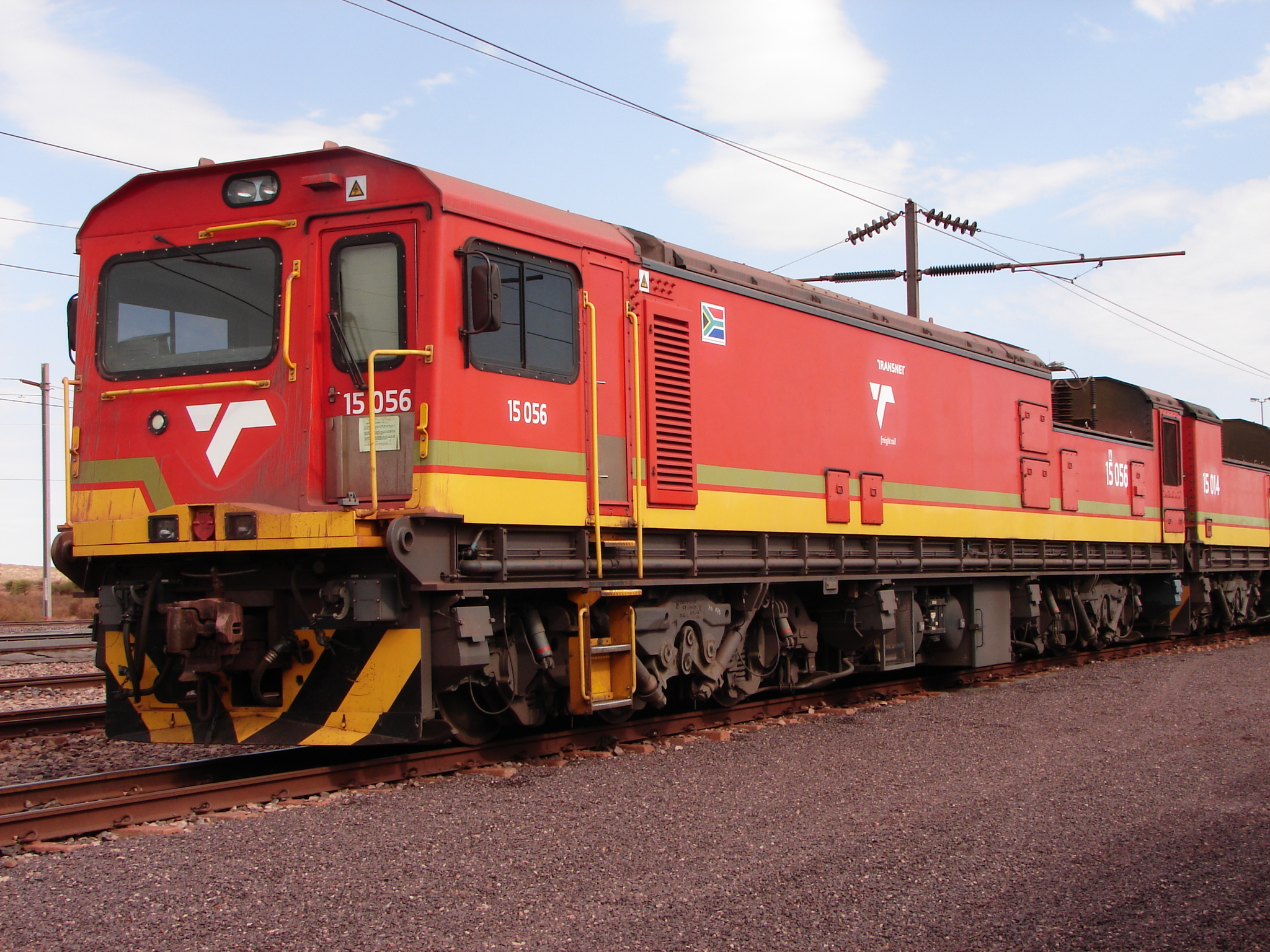
No. 15-056 in the Erts Yard near Kathu, Northern Cape, 5 October 2015

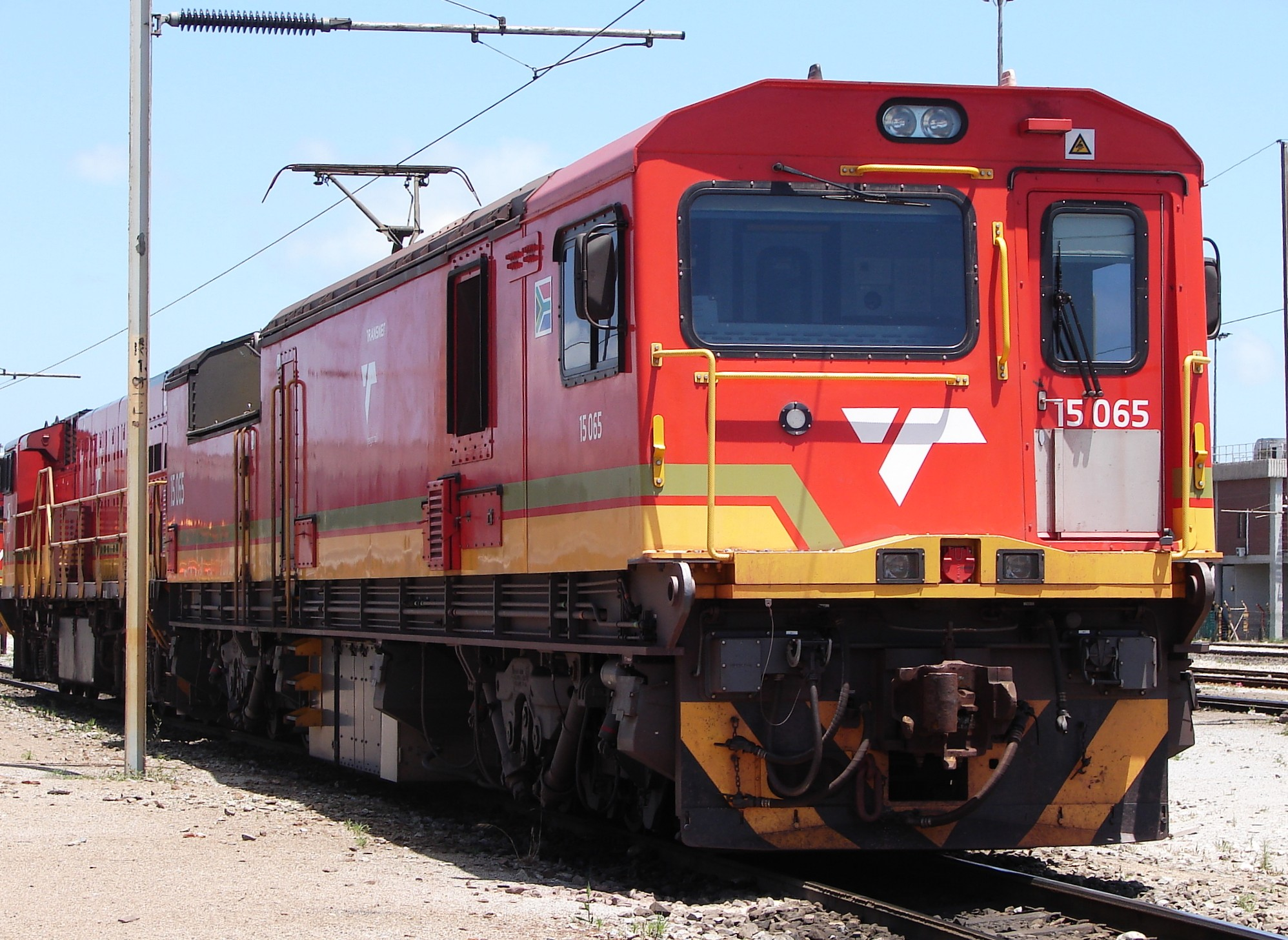
No. 15-065 in the Salkor Yard, Saldanha, 13 November 2014
