= South African Class 34-500 =

Class of locomotives

Iscor Class 34 South African Class 34-500
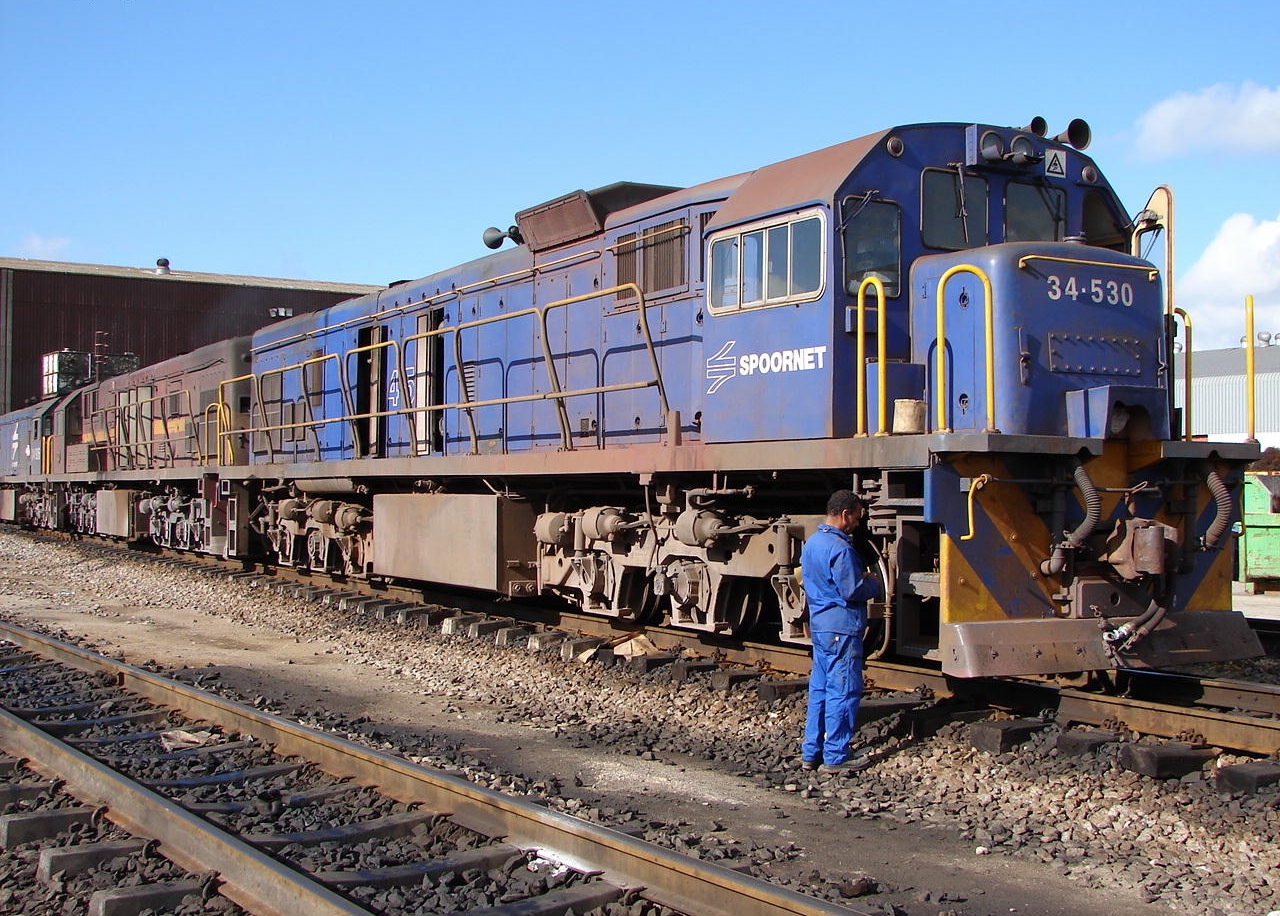
- No. 34-530 at Saldanha, 12 September 2007
Type and origin
- Power type: Diesel-electric
- Designer: General Electric
- Builder: SA GE-DL Locomotive Group
- Serial number: 35261-35282, 40400-40419, 40570-40571, 40578-40579
- Model: GE U26C
- Build date: 1974–1977
- Total produced: 46
Specifications
- Configuration
  - AAR: C-C
  - UIC: Co'Co'
  - Commonwealth: Co-Co
- Gauge: 3 ft 6 in (1,067 mm) Cape gauge
- Wheel diameter: 915 mm (36 in)
- Wheelbase: 13,004 mm (42 ft 8 in)
  - Bogie: 3,188 mm (10 ft 6 in)
- Pivot centres: 10,058 mm (33 ft 0 in)
- Length
  - Over couplers: 17,982 mm (59 ft 0 in)
- Width: 2,756 mm (9 ft 1 in)
- Height: 3,962 mm (13 ft 0 in)
- Axle load: 18,850 kg (41,560 lb)
- Adhesive weight: 113,100 kg (249,300 lb)
- Loco weight: 113,100 kg (249,300 lb) max
- Fuel type: Diesel
- Fuel capacity: 7,000 litres (1,500 imp gal; 1,800 US gal)
- Prime mover: GE 7FDL-12
- RPM range: 450–1,050
  - RPM low idle: 450
  - RPM idle: 535
  - Maximum RPM: 1,050
- Engine type: 4-stroke diesel
- Aspiration: Elliott H-581 turbocharger
- Alternator: 10 pole 3 phase GE 5GT-A11C1
- Traction motors: Six GE 5GE-761A13 DC 4 pole
  - Rating 1 hour: 665A
  - Continuous: 655A @ 24 km/h (15 mph)
- Cylinders: V12
- Gear ratio: 92:19
- MU working: 6 maximum
- Loco brake: 28-LAV-1 with vigilance control
- Train brakes: Westinghouse 6CDX4UC compressor/exhauster
- Air tank cap.: 825 litres (181 imp gal; 218 US gal)
- Compressor: 0.039 m^{3}/s (1.4 cu ft/s)
- Exhauster: 0.155 m^{3}/s (5.5 cu ft/s)
- Couplers: AAR knuckle type E
Performance figures
- Maximum speed: 100 km/h (62 mph)
- Power output
  - Starting: 2,050 kW (2,750 hp)
  - Continuous: 1,940 kW (2,600 hp)
- Tractive effort
  - Starting: 272 kN (61,000 lbf) @ 25% adhesion
  - Continuous: 218 kN (49,000 lbf) @ 26 km/h (16 mph)
- Factor of adh.
  - Starting: 25%
  - Continuous: 20%
- Brakeforce: 60% ratio @ 345 kPa (50.0 psi)
- Dynamic brake peak effort: 180 kN (40,000 lbf) @ 29 km/h (18 mph)
Career
- Operators: Iscor; Douglas Colliery; South African Railways; Spoornet; Kumba Iron Ore; Sheltam; Transnet Freight Rail
- Class: Class 34-500 (Class 34-400 ex Iscor)
- Number in class: 46
- Numbers: 34-501 to 34-539 (SAR); 1D-40D, G03 & G04 (Iscor); D5 & D6 (Douglas)
- Delivered: 1974–1977
- First run: 1974

The South African Railways Class 34-500 of 1974 is a diesel-electric locomotive.

Between 1974 and 1977, the state-owned South African Iron and Steel Corporation placed forty-four General Electric type U26C diesel-electric locomotives in service. They were employed on Iscor's 1974-built Sishen-Saldanha iron ore line and as heavy shunters at the Sishen mine. In 1977, another two locomotives were built for the Douglas Colliery near Witbank. Also in 1977, thirty-nine of the Iscor locomotives were transferred to the South African Railways where they were initially designated "Class 34-400 ex Iscor" and later became commonly known as Class 34-500.

== Manufacturer ==
The Class 34-500 type GE U26C diesel-electric locomotive, also known as "Class 34-400 ex Iscor", was designed by General Electric and built for the South African Iron and Steel Corporation (Iscor) by the South African General Electric-Dorman Long Locomotive Group (SA GE-DL, later Dorbyl). Forty-four locomotives were delivered to Iscor on three orders:

- Twenty-two were delivered between 1974 and 1975, of which twenty were numbered in the range from 1D to 20D and geared for mainline service while two were numbered G01 and G02 and geared for shunting work.
- Twenty more were delivered between 1976 and 1977, numbered in the range from 21D to 40D and geared for mainline service.
- Another two were delivered in 1977, geared for shunting and numbered G03 and G04.

In 1977, two locomotives were also built for the Douglas Colliery near Witbank in Transvaal, numbered D5 and D6. Of the Iscor mainline locomotives, 39 were transferred to the South African Railways in that same year.

== Distinguishing features ==
The Iscor locomotives were delivered with a 7,000 litres (1,500 imperial gallons; 1,800 US gallons) fuel tank to cope with the lack of en route refuelling points on the Sishen-Saldanha line. To facilitate the larger fuel tank, the inter-bogie linkage found on all other South African U26C models was omitted on these locomotives. To maintain its lateral balance, a slab of metal was attached to each bogie in place of the removed linkage.

As built, the GE Classes 34-000, 34-400 and 34-900 locomotives were visually indistinguishable from each other. Many of the Class 34-500 locomotives could be distinguished from the others by the air conditioning units mounted on their cab roofs, but not all of them were so equipped. When it was still a feature unique to them, they could also be distinguished by their running board-mounted handrails. All South African diesel-electric locomotives have their side handrails mounted along the upper edges of their long hoods. The ex Iscor Class 34-500s, however, were equipped with additional removable running board-mounted handrails. Since these handrails are slide-fit into brackets welded onto the running boards, they are easily removed.

Since c. 2009, other mainline diesel-electric locomotive types also emerged from the Koedoespoort Transwerk shops with running board-mounted handrails after major overhauls.

At some stage during the mid-1980s, all Class 34-000, 34-400 and 34-500 locomotives had saddle filters installed across the long hood, mounted just to the rear of the screens behind the cab on the sides. Since then, Class 34-900 locomotives could be distinguished from the older models by the absence of the saddle filter.

== Electronic control system ==
Beginning in 2010, some locomotives were equipped with electronic fuel injection and GE "Bright Star" control systems. On some of the first locomotives to be so modified, externally visible evidence of the modification is a raised middle portion of the long hood.

== Service ==
=== Changes in ownership ===
In 1977, all mainline rail operations on the Sishen-Saldanha iron ore line was taken over from Iscor by the South African Railways (SAR). Between November 1977 and June 1978, 39 of the Iscor mainline locomotives were transferred to the SAR. They were initially designated "Class 34-400 ex Iscor" and renumbered in the range from 34-501 to 34-539, but these units were also commonly referred to as Class 34-500 from their SAR number range. This eventually became the accepted official classification.

Five locomotives were retained by Iscor to work at the Sishen mine, numbers G01 to G04 and 40D. These are now Kumba Iron Ore's units numbers 01 to 05, with no. 40D having become Kumba no. 05.

The Douglas Colliery locomotives are now in Sheltam livery, initially as Sheltam numbers 5 and 6 and later renumbered to 2602 and 2603 respectively.

=== South African Railways service ===
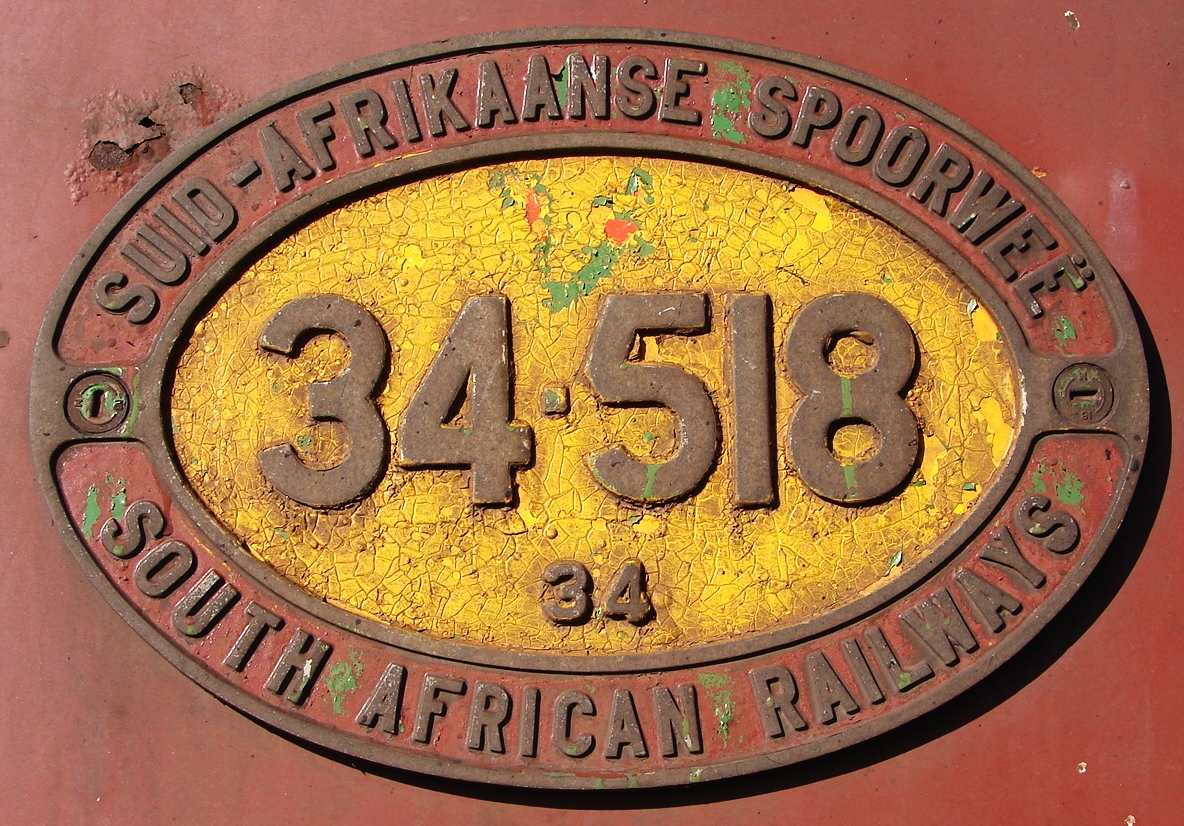

While it is believed that they were for the most part renumbered from Iscor numbers to SAR numbers in sequence with their Iscor numbers, at least one locomotive has been observed as being out of sequence. No. 34-523 bore works plate no. 35265, identifying it as ex Iscor no. 5D. It can be presumed that no. 34-505 carried works plate GE 40402, which would make it ex Iscor no. 23D, but since the works plates have over time disappeared from most of these locomotives, this cannot be confirmed.

Until 2012, when they began to be replaced by new GE Class 43-000 type C30ACi locomotives, most of the Class 34-500s remained on the 861-kilometre-long (535-mile) Sishen–Saldanha Orex line to haul ore from the open cast iron mines at Sishen near Kathu in the Northern Cape to the harbour at Saldanha in the Western Cape. Some also ended up being allocated to other depots at times. During the 1980s several were observed working goods and passenger trains between Port Elizabeth and Bloemfontein and between Beaufort West and Kimberley, still clad in their Iscor livery.

=== Mixed power working ===
On the Orex line, the GE Class 34 family of diesel-electric locomotives ran consisted to Class 9E and Class 15E electric locomotives to haul the 342-wagon iron ore trains. Each wagon has a 100-ton capacity and the trains are at least 3.72 kilometres (2.31 miles) in length, powered by mixed consists of Class 9E and Class 15E electric and GE type U26C Class 34-000, 34-400, 34-500, 34-900 and from 2012, GE type C30ACi Class 43-000 diesel-electric locomotives. In South Africa, mixed electric and diesel-electric consists are unique to the iron ore line.

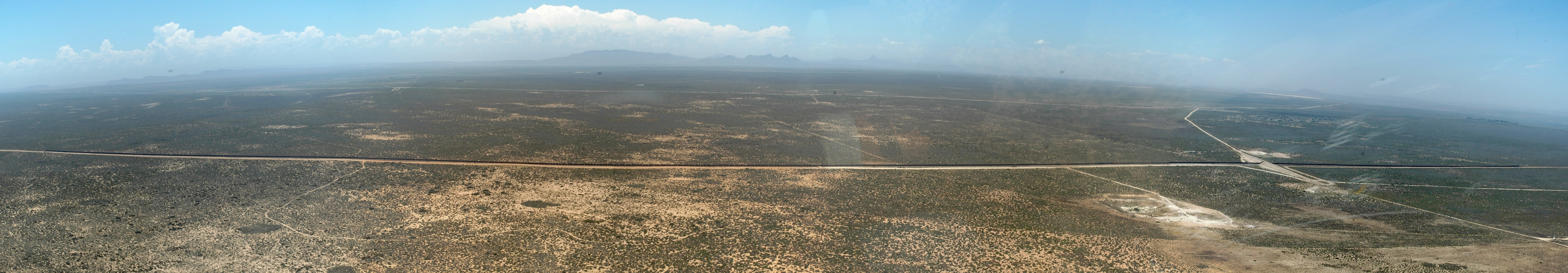
Ore train about 100 kilometres (62 miles) north of Lamberts Bay

A Class 9E or Class 15E electric locomotive serves as the master of each mixed electric and diesel-electric consist, with a total of between nine and twelve locomotives per train, twelve being the maximum number allowed. Before the Class 15E was placed in service in 2010, motive power usually consisted of three sets of locomotives, each set made up of one or two Class 9E electrics and one or two Class 34 diesel-electrics, with each set's leading electric locomotive controlling its respective set of diesel-electrics by means of a slimkabel (smart cable). In effect, each ore train was made up of three separate 114-wagon trains consisted together with the locomotives of all three trains being controlled by means of a Locotrol radio distributed power control system by one crew in the leading electric locomotive. A typical train would therefore be made up of locomotive set A, 114 wagons, locomotive set B, 114 wagons, locomotive set C, and 114 wagons.

Some problems were experienced using this configuration and after a couple of major derailments, the locomotive configuration was changed to four sets, with locomotive set D initially made up of two Class 34 diesel-electric locomotives at the rear end of the train, pushing at between 40% and 50% of tractive power at all times, depending on the grades being traversed. The total maximum number allowed was still between nine and twelve locomotives per train.

As more Class 15Es were delivered and placed in service, Class 9E or Class 15E electrics replaced the pair of Class 34 diesel-electrics in set D. At the same time, the more powerful Classes 15E and 43-000 also made it possible to use as few as seven locomotives per train, with locomotive sets A, B and C each made up of one Class 9E or 15E and one Class 34 or 43-000, and set D of a single Class 9E or 15E.

== Works numbers ==
The Class 34-500 builder’s works numbers, ownership changes and renumbering are listed in the table.

34-500, GE type U26C
GE-DL works no.	Year built	Built for	Original no.	New owner	New no.
35261	1974–75	Iscor	1D	SAR	34-501
35262	1974–75	Iscor	2D	SAR	34-502
35263	1974–75	Iscor	3D	SAR	34-503
35264	1974–75	Iscor	4D	SAR	34-504
35265	1974–75	Iscor	5D	SAR	34-523
35266	1974–75	Iscor	6D	SAR	34-506
35267	1974–75	Iscor	7D	SAR	34-507
35268	1974–75	Iscor	8D	SAR	34-508
35269	1974–75	Iscor	9D	SAR	34-509
35270	1974–75	Iscor	10D	SAR	34-510
35271	1974–75	Iscor	11D	SAR	34-511
35272	1974–75	Iscor	12D	SAR	34-512
35273	1974–75	Iscor	13D	SAR	34-513
35274	1974–75	Iscor	14D	SAR	34-514
35275	1974–75	Iscor	15D	SAR	34-515
35276	1974–75	Iscor	16D	SAR	34-516
35277	1974–75	Iscor	17D	SAR	34-517
35278	1974–75	Iscor	18D	SAR	34-518
35279	1974–75	Iscor	19D	SAR	34-519
35280	1974–75	Iscor	20D	SAR	34-520
35281	1975	Iscor	G01	Kumba	01
35282	1975	Iscor	G02	Kumba	02
40400	1976–77	Iscor	21D	SAR	34-521
40401	1976–77	Iscor	22D	SAR	34-522
40402	1976–77	Iscor	23D	SAR	34-505
40403	1976–77	Iscor	24D	SAR	34-524
40404	1976–77	Iscor	25D	SAR	34-525
40405	1976–77	Iscor	26D	SAR	34-526
40406	1976–77	Iscor	27D	SAR	34-527
40407	1976–77	Iscor	28D	SAR	34-528
40408	1976–77	Iscor	29D	SAR	34-529
40409	1976–77	Iscor	30D	SAR	34-530
40410	1976–77	Iscor	31D	SAR	34-531
40411	1976–77	Iscor	32D	SAR	34-532
40412	1976–77	Iscor	33D	SAR	34-533
40413	1976–77	Iscor	34D	SAR	34-534
40414	1976–77	Iscor	35D	SAR	34-535
40415	1976–77	Iscor	36D	SAR	34-536
40416	1976–77	Iscor	37D	SAR	34-537
40417	1976–77	Iscor	38D	SAR	34-538
40418	1976–77	Iscor	39D	SAR	34-539
40419	1977	Iscor	40D	Kumba	05
40570	1977	Iscor	G03	Kumba	03
40571	1977	Iscor	G04	Kumba	04
40578	1977	Douglas	D5	Sheltam	5/2602
40579	1977	Douglas	D6	Sheltam	6/2603

== Liveries ==
The Class 34-500 were all delivered in an Iscor livery. After their transfer to the SAR, they were gradually repainted in the SAR Gulf Red livery with signal red buffer beams, yellow side stripes on the long hood sides and a yellow V on each end. In the 1990s some of the Class 34-500 units began to be repainted in the Spoornet orange livery with a yellow and blue chevron pattern on the buffer beams. At least one later received the Spoornet maroon livery. In the late 1990s most of them were repainted in the Spoornet blue livery with outline numbers on the long hood sides. After 2008 in the Transnet Freight Rail (TFR) era, many were repainted in the TFR red, green and yellow livery.

== Illustration ==
The main picture shows no. 34-530 in Spoornet blue livery with outline numbers. Some of the other liveries applied to Class 34-500 locomotives are illustrated below.

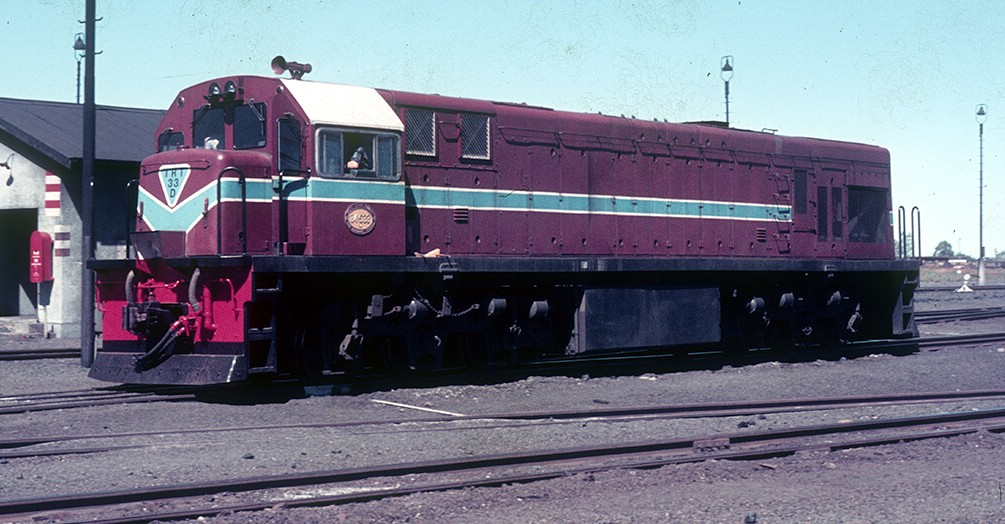
No. 34-533 still in Iscor livery but with SAR cabside number plates, Beaufort West, 7 April 1980

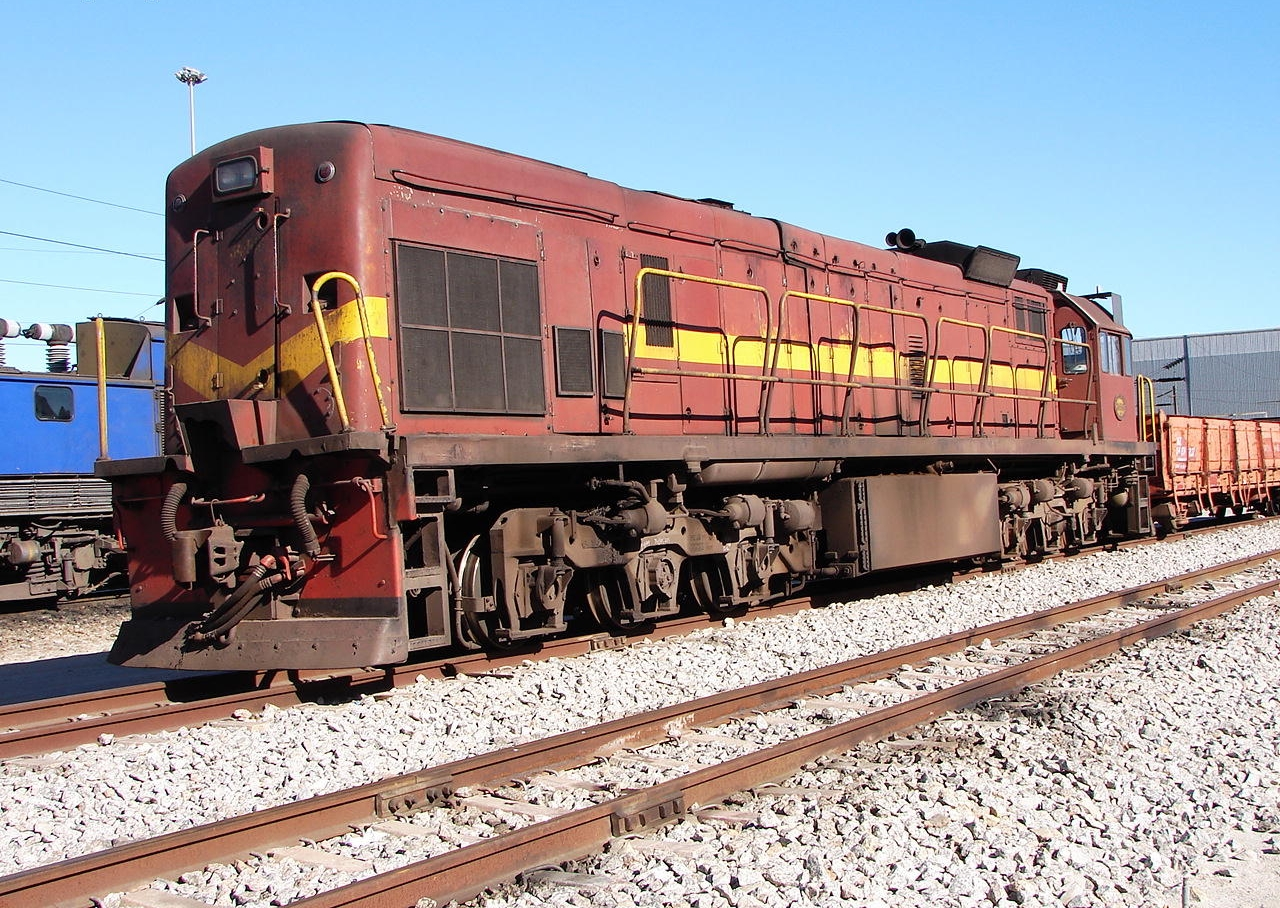
No. 34-516 in SAR Gulf Red and yellow, Saldanha, 19 August 2010

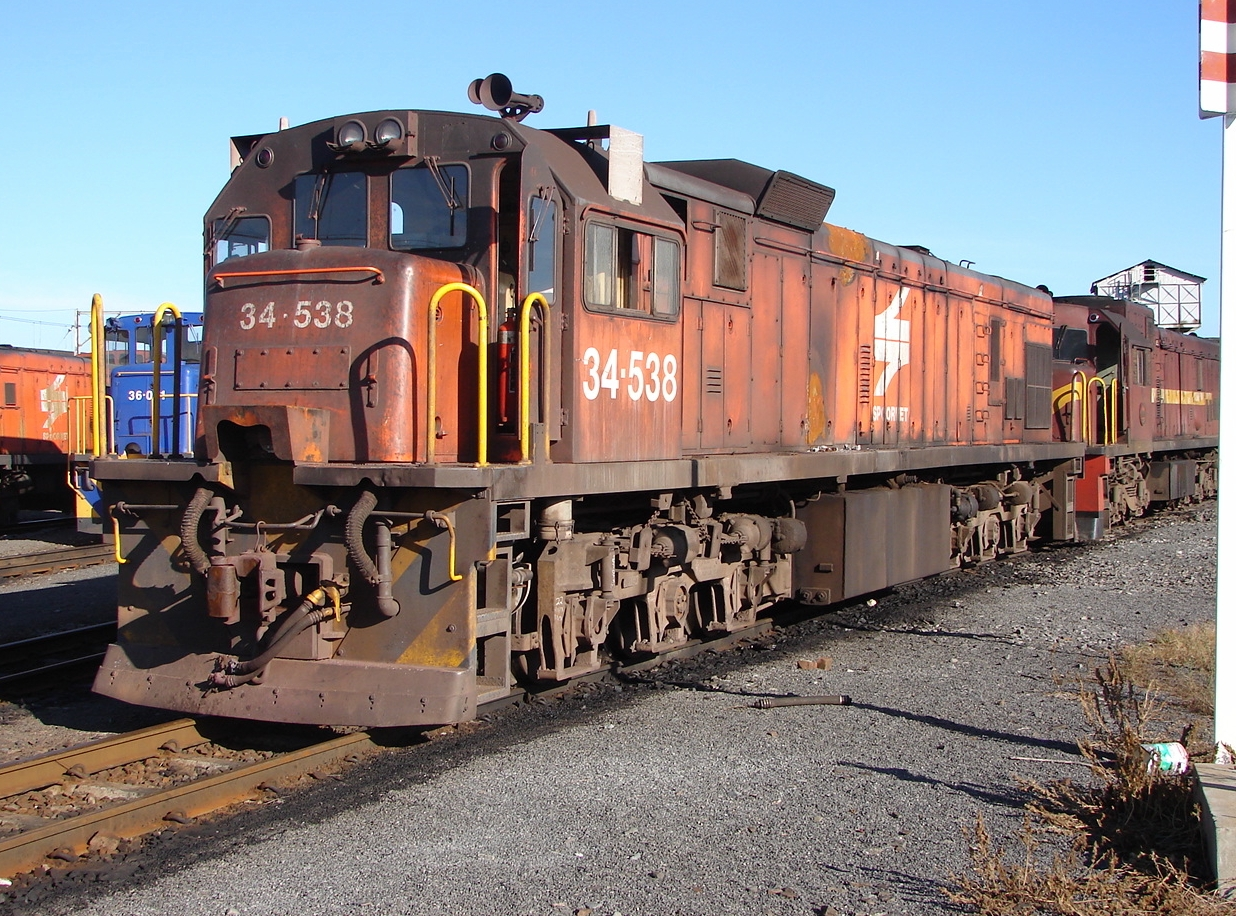
No. 34-538 in Spoornet orange livery at Bellville, 26 April 2009

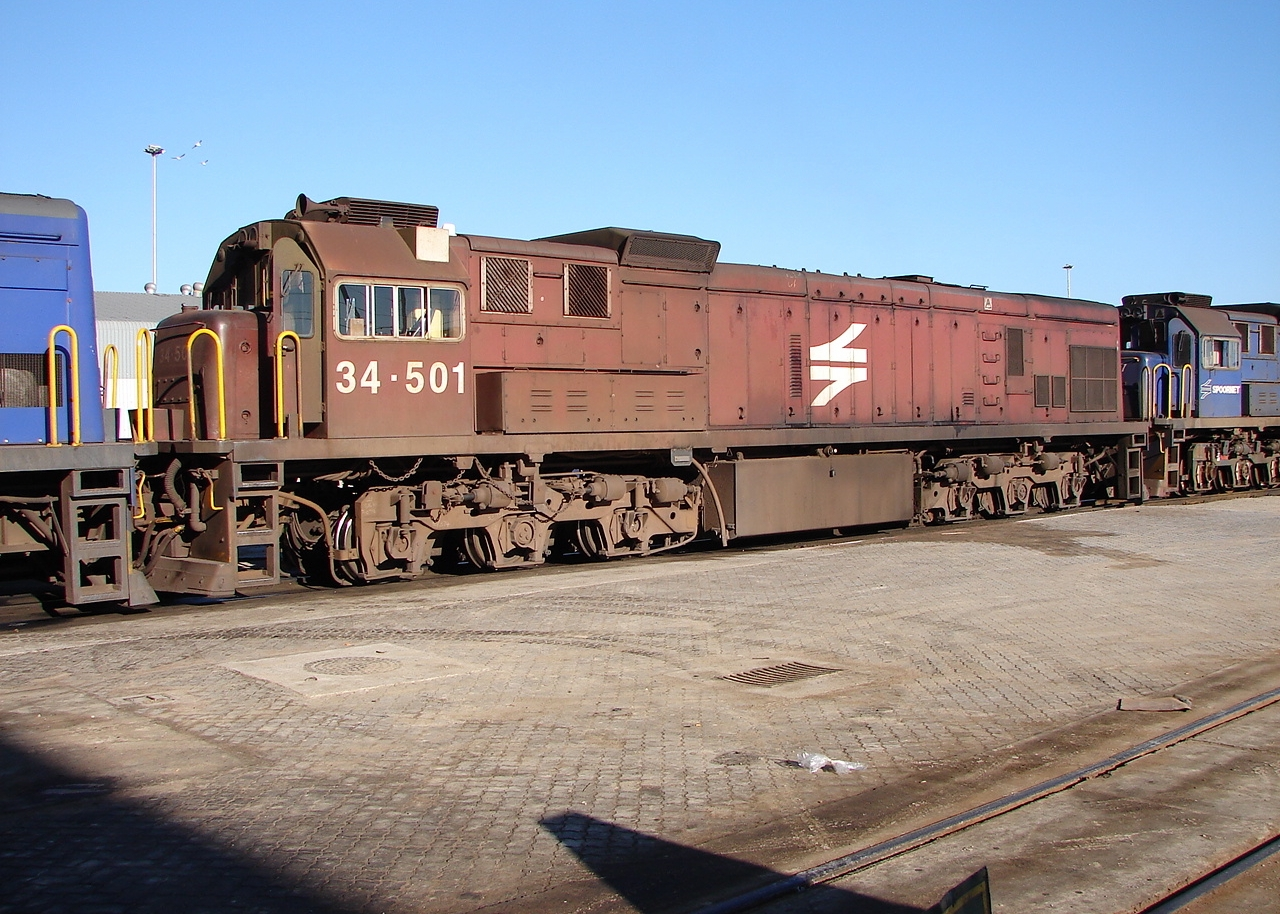
No. 34-501 in Spoornet maroon livery at Saldanha, 26 July 2009

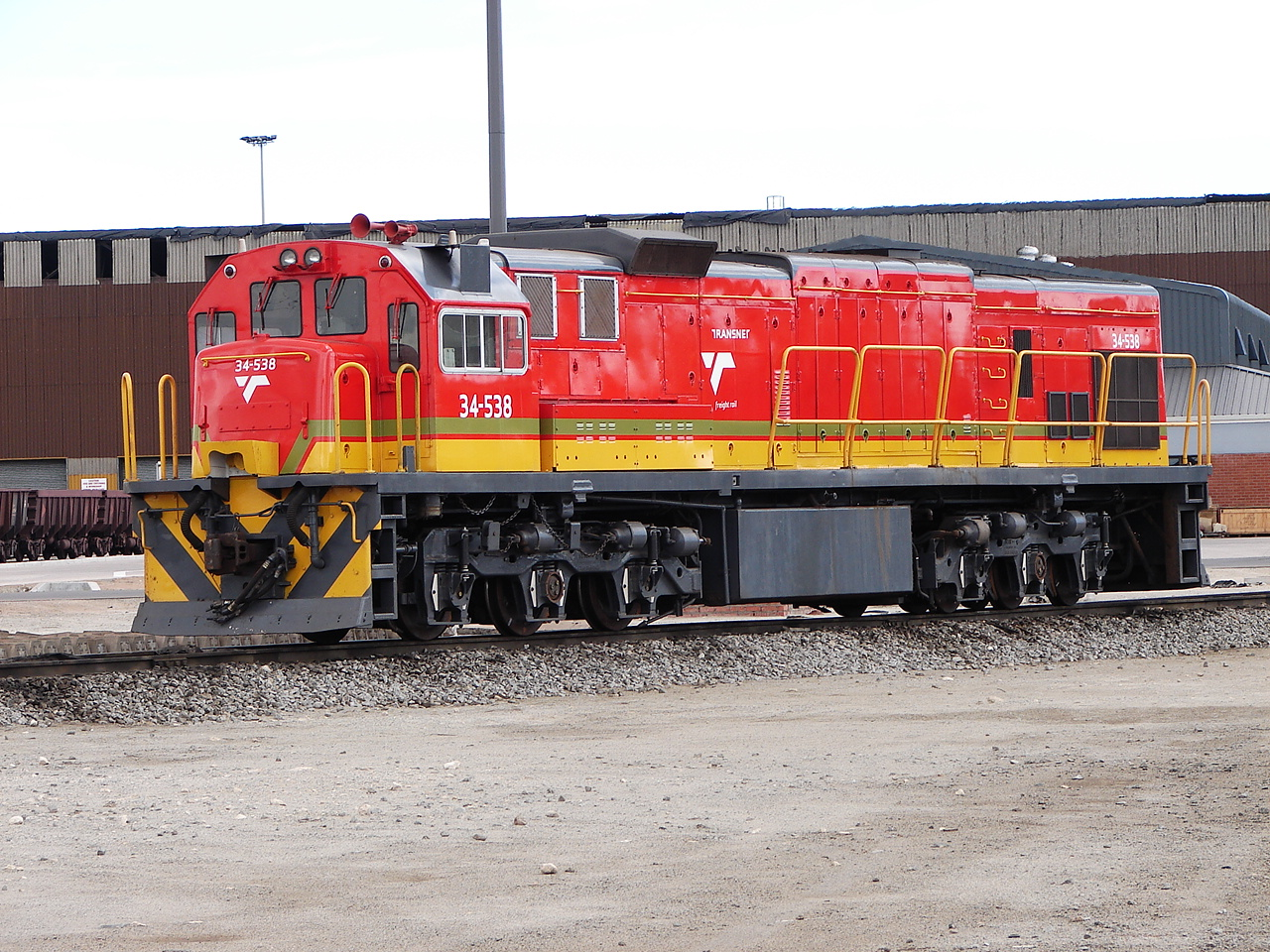
Bright Star no. 34-538 in TFR livery, Saldanha, 10 February 2013

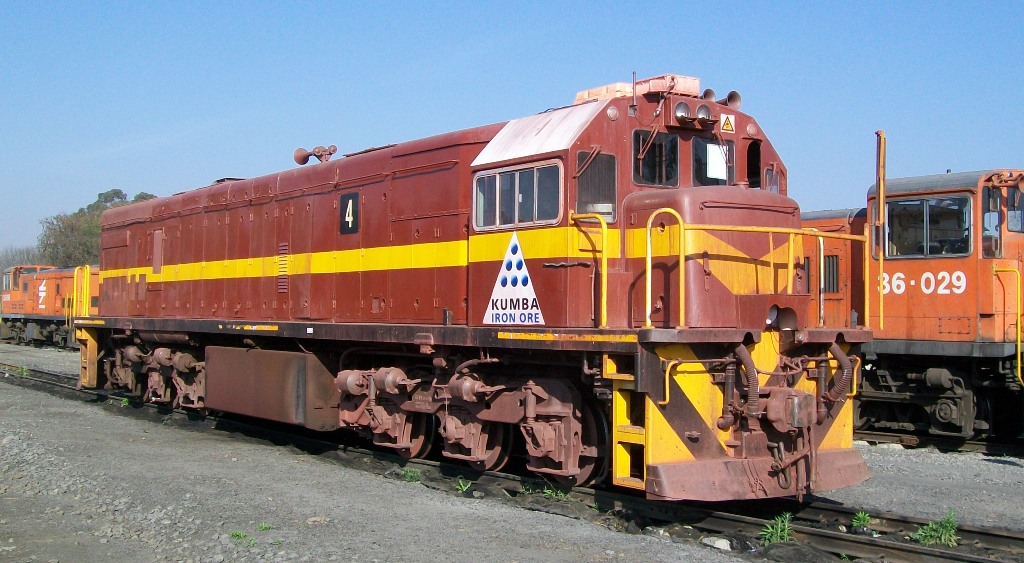
Kumba Iron Ore no. 4, ex Iscor no. G04, at Leeuhof depot, Vereeniging, 5 September 2010
