= Sishen–Saldanha railway line =

Railway line in South Africa

Ore Export Line

Overview
- Owner: Transnet Freight Rail
- Locale: Western & Northern Cape, South Africa
- Termini: Sishen, Northern Cape; Saldanha, Western Cape

Service
- Type: Iron ore freight
- Operator: Transnet Freight Rail
- Depot: Salkor Yard

History
- Opened: 1976

Technical
- Line length: 861 km (535 mi)
- Num of tracks: 1
- Track gauge: 1,067 mm (3 ft 6 in)
- Electrification: 50 kV AC overhead catenary
- Operating speed: 80 km/h (50 mph)

The Sishen–Saldanha railway line, also known as the Ore Export Line (OREX), is an 861-kilometre-long (535 mi) heavy-haul railway line in South Africa. It connects iron ore mines near Sishen in the Northern Cape with the port at Saldanha Bay in the Western Cape. It is used primarily to transport iron ore (60 million tonnes per year) and does not carry passenger traffic.

A video of the end part of the 342-wagon 3,780-metre long Sishen–Saldanha iron-ore train on its way to Saldanha in the Western Cape, South Africa

The Sishen–Saldanha line was built by Iscor, the then iron and steel parastatal, opening in 1976.

In 1977 the line was transferred to Transnet Freight Rail, then known as South African Railways & Harbours, and was electrified. A voltage of 50 kV AC was chosen instead of the usual 25 kV to haul heavier loads and allow greater distance between transformers.

A single-track line with 10 crossing loops to allow trains travelling in opposite directions to pass was constructed. The number of crossing loops has increased to 19 to increase line capacity.

From an altitude of 1,295 metres (4,249 ft) at Sishen, the line climbs for 42 kilometres (26 mi) before descending to cross the Orange River about 10 kilometres (6 mi) downstream of Groblershoop. For the next 300 kilometres (190 mi), the line rises and falls before descending towards the Atlantic coast. The railway crosses the Olifants River on a 1,035 metres (3,396 ft) viaduct between Vredendal and Lutzville and reaches the coast about 160 kilometres (100 mi) north of Saldanha. From there the line follows a coastal route.

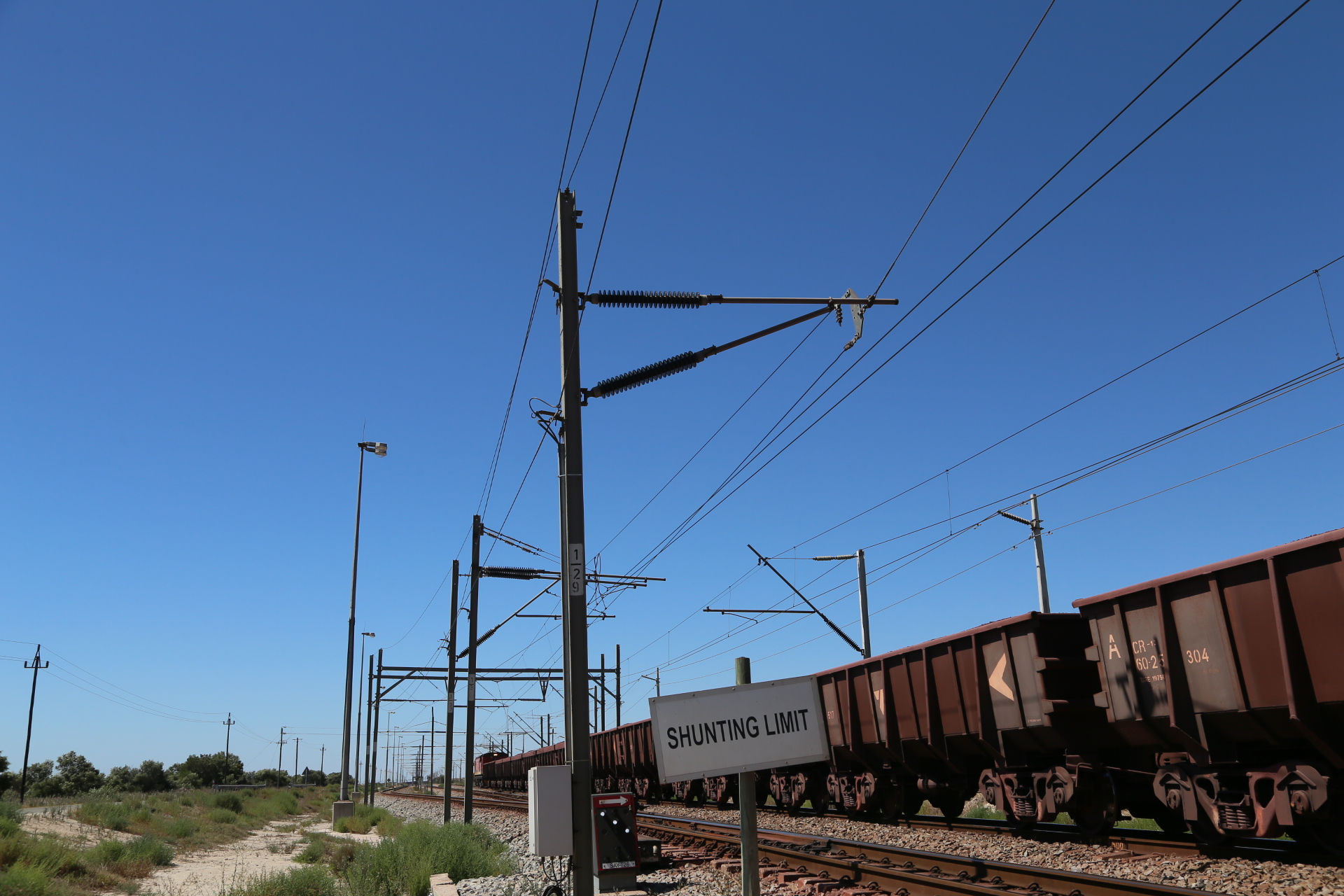
Note the very long 50 kV insulators on the catenary masts

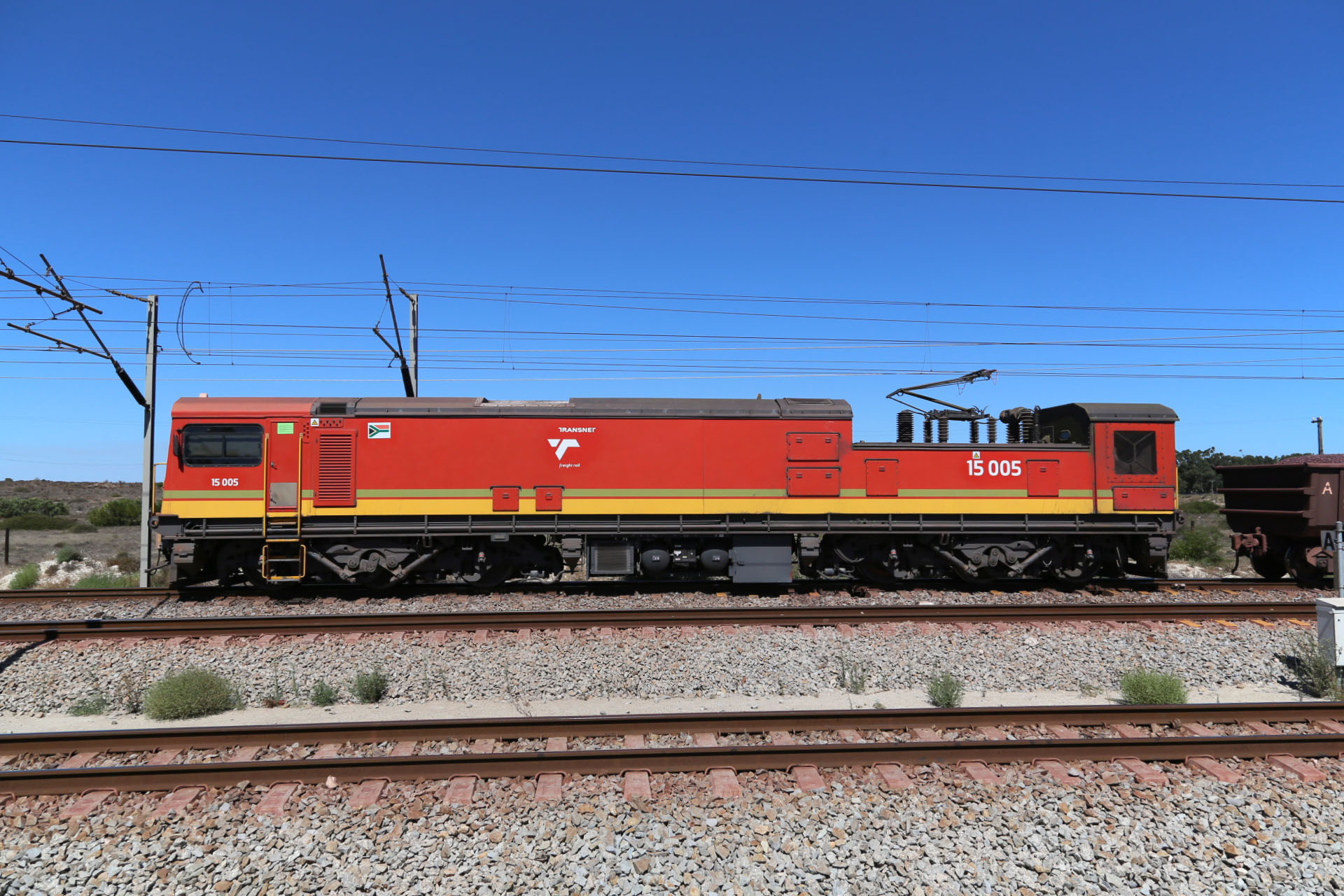
Example of a locomotive

Inside the cab of a locomotive

Initial train lengths consisted of three class 9E electric locomotives, hauling 210 type CR ore wagons with a payload of 80 tonnes. Upgraded wagons now carry 100 tonnes. Train lengths were increased in 2007 to 342 wagons, employing Radio Distributed Power (RDP) technology. These trains (initially with 10 locomotives, a mix of electric and diesel-electric) and 342 wagons have a total mass of 41,400 tonnes and are 3,780 metres (12,400 ft) long, the longest production trains in the world. The same 342-wagon trains are now powered by just five 15Es, crewed by one driver and one assistant.

The train length was increased in October 2019 to 375 wagons. The line set a world record for the longest train in October 2026 with a 7.6 kilometres (4.7 mi) train consisting of 12 locomotives hauling 696 empty wagons.

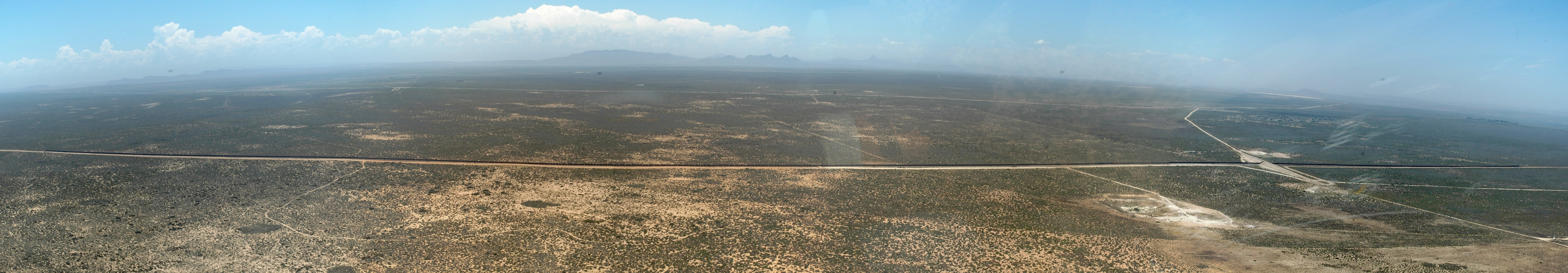
An aerial view of an ore train on the Sishen–Saldanha line

== See also ==
- South African Class 9E, Series 1
- South African Class 9E, Series 2
- South African Class 15E
- South African Class 34-000
- South African Class 34-400
- South African Class 34-500
- South African Class 34-900
- South African Class 43-000
