= Dingleton =

- Location within Northern Cape Location within South Africa
- Coordinates: 27°46′S 22°58′E
- Country: South Africa
- Province: Northern Cape
- District: John Taolo Gaetsewe
- Municipality: Gamagara

Area
  - Total: 180.63 km^{2} (69.74 sq mi)

Population (2011)
  - Total: 11,034
  - Density: 61.086/km^{2} (158.21/sq mi)

Racial makeup (2011)
  - Black African: 78.5%
  - Coloured: 19.0%
  - Indian/Asian: 0.8%
  - White: 0.2%
  - Other: 1.5%

First languages (2011)
  - Tswana: 57.1%
  - Afrikaans: 26.3%
  - English: 4.4%
  - Sotho: 1.6%
  - Other: 10.6%
- Time zone: UTC+2 (SAST)
- Postal code (street): 8445
- PO box: 8445

Dingleton is a town in Northern Cape, South Africa.

The nearby Sishen mine is an iron ore mining activity, connected to the port of Saldanha Bay by the Sishen-Saldanha Railway Line. The line is electrified at 50 kV AC and the trains using this line are amongst the heaviest trains in the world.

The state-owned mining company Iscor started developing the township, originally named Sishen, in 1953 to accommodate the local miners. The houses were sold to individuals in the early 1980s. On 23 June 1990 the town's name was changed from Sishen to Dingleton.

The proximity of the mining activities led to complaints from the residents of Dingleton, and expectations that the residents would be relocated. The town's infrastructure is old and in disrepair. To allow for Sishen's expansion, Kumba, an Anglo American subsidiary, intends to relocate the Dingleton community.
